= List of wars involving Sri Lanka =

This is a list of wars involving Sri Lanka and its predecessor states.

== Major conflicts ==
Legend
Victory
Defeat
Other result
Ongoing

Conflict	Sri Lanka (and allies)	Opponents	Results
Anuradhapura period (377 BCE–1017)
Battle of Vijithapura (162–1 BCE)	Anuradhapura Kingdom: Dutugamunu the Great	Early Cholas: Elara	Victory Main article: Chola–Sinhalese wars: City of Vijithapura captured by Dutugamunu's army
110 Chola invasion of Anuradhapura (110)	Anuradhapura Kingdom	Early Cholas	Chola Victory Main article: Chola–Sinhalese wars
Gajabahu's invasion of Chola (120)	Anuradhapura Kingdom: Gajabahu I	Early Cholas	Victory Main article: Chola–Sinhalese wars
Pandyan invasion of Anuradhapura (846)	Anuradhapura Kingdom: Sena I	Pandya dynasty: Srimara Srivallabha	Pandyan Victory Main article: Pandyan–Sinhalese wars: Anuradhapura Sacked and plundered by the Pandya forces; Battle of Mahatalita (circa 846–866 CE); The defeat at Mahatalita caused a temporary collapse of organized Sinhalese resistance, though the war eventually ended with a treaty where the Pandyas withdrew and restored the country.
Anuradhapura invasion of Pandya (862)	Anuradhapura Kingdom	Pandya dynasty	Pandyan Victory Main article: Pandyan–Sinhalese wars
Battle of Vellore (915)	Pandya dynasty: Maravarman Rajasimha II; Supported by: Anuradhapura Kingdom: Kassapa V	Chola Empire: Parantaka I	Chola Victory Main article: Chola–Pandyan wars: The combined forces of the Pandyan army and the Sri Lankan expeditionary troops marched north to repel the Cholas.; With his combined army utterly routed, King Rajasimha II fled to Sri Lanka in exile. He took the Pandya royal crown and sacred coronation insignia with him, leaving his treasury behind.; Eventually moved to the Chera kingdom because his mother was a Chera princess, leaving his crown in the safekeeping of the Sri Lankan king.
917 Anuradhapura invasion of Pandya (917)	Anuradhapura Kingdom	Pandya dynasty	Defeat Main article: Pandyan–Sinhalese wars
946 Chola invasion of Anuradhapura (946)	Anuradhapura Kingdom: Udaya IV	Chola Empire: Parantaka I	Anuradhapura Victory Main article: Chola–Sinhalese wars: Parantaka I defeated the Sinhalese forces and sacked Anuradhapura, although he was unable to secure lasting control over the region.; After their withdrawal, Udaya I's General Viduragga launched a counteroffensive into Chola territory, successfully compelling them to return property seized during their invasion.
Battle of Chevur (959)	Pandya dynasty Supported by: Anuradhapura Kingdom	Chola Empire	Chola Victory Main article: Chola–Pandyan wars: A decisive battlefield victory for the Cholas, resulting in the routing of Pandyan forces
959 Chola invasion of Anuradhapura (959)	Anuradhapura Kingdom	Chola Empire	Treaty signed Main article: Chola–Sinhalese wars: Following the Battle of Chevur a punitive naval invasion launched by Parantaka II to punish the Anuradhapura Kingdom for militarily backing the Pandyas; A treaty was signed, establishing a fragile peace
Chola conquest of Anuradhapura (992–1017)	Anuradhapura Kingdom: Pandyan Allies	Chola Empire	Chola Victory Main article: Chola–Sinhalese wars: Anuradhapura destroyed by Chola forces; Polonnaruwa designated as the Chola administrative capital in Sri Lanka; Rajarata annexed as a Chola province in 993; Maya Rata and parts of Ruhuna annexed as a Chola Province in 1017
Sinhalese Resistance (1017–1070)	Anuradhapura Kingdom	Chola Empire	Anuradhapura Victory Main article: Chola–Sinhalese wars
Polonnaruwa period (1017–1232)
First Polonnaruwa–Pagan War (1164–65)	Polonnaruwa Kingdom; Angkorian Empire: Parakramabahu I	Pagan kingdom Chola Empire (in Pegu): Narathu	Victory Main article: Polonnaruwa–Pagan War
Pandyan Civil War (1169–1177)	Polonnaruwa Kingdom; Pandya dynasty: Parakramabahu I	Chola Empire; Pandya dynasty	Defeat Main articles: Pandyan–Sinhalese wars and Chola–Sinhalese wars: Rival kingdoms abandon military intervention; Kingdom of Polonnaruwa and Vira Pandya III control Rameshwaram until 1182; Chola backed-faction occupies the majority of Pandya Nadu; Pandya Nadu re-established
1173 Polonnaruwa invasion of Chola (1173)	Polonnaruwa Kingdom: Parakramabahu I	Pandya dynasty Chola Empire	Victory Main articles: Chola–Sinhalese wars and Pandyan–Sinhalese wars
Second Polonnaruwa–Pagan War (1180–81)	Polonnaruwa Kingdom; Angkorian Empire: Parakramabahu I	Pagan kingdom: Narapatisithu	Victory Main article: Polonnaruwa–Pagan War: The tensions and wars ended with a peace agreement in 1181
1202 Chola invasion of Polonnaruwa (1202)	Polonnaruwa Kingdom: Sahassa Malla	Chola Empire	Main article: Chola–Sinhalese wars
1208 Chola invasion of Polonnaruwa (1208)	Polonnaruwa Kingdom: Queen Kalyanavati	Chola Empire	Defeat Main article: Chola–Sinhalese wars: The invasion completely overran the royal strongholds. Another historical record, the Bopitiya slab inscription, notes that the defense collapsed so swiftly that Queen Kalyanavati had to be physically carried away on the shoulders of her remaining guards to a safe hiding place. Queen Kalyanavati's reign ends.
Chola invasion of Polonnaruwa under Anikanga (1209)	Polonnaruwa Kingdom: Dharmasoka; General Āyasmanta	Polonnaruwa Kingdom; Chola Empire: Anikanga	Defeat Main article: Chola–Sinhalese wars: Anikanga put both the infant King Dharmasoka and the regent, General Ayasmanta, to death; having wiped out the leadership, he seized the throne for himself, taking the title Anikanga Mahadipada, ruing for 17 days.
1210 Chola invasion of Polonnaruwa (1210)	Polonnaruwa Kingdom: Queen Lilavati	Chola Empire: Lokissara	Defeat Main article: Chola–Sinhalese wars: Led by a military chief named Lokissara, the invaders took advantage of the deeply fragmented Sinhalese defenses. They overran the capital of Polonnaruwa with minimal resistance. Lilavati was successfully deposed, and Lokissara seized the throne, ruling the region for roughly nine months.
Invasion of Parakrama Pandyan II (1212)	Polonnaruwa Kingdom: Queen Lilavati	Pandya dynasty: Parakrama Pandyan II	Defeat Main article: Pandyan–Sinhalese wars: The Pandyan King Parakrama Pandyan II invaded Sri Lanka from South India. His forces defeated Lilavati’s remaining defenders, permanently stripping her of power in 1212 CE. Following this defeat, Queen Lilavati completely disappeared from the historical record.
Invasion of Kalinga Magha (1215)	Polonnaruwa Kingdom: Parakrama Pandyan II	Eastern Ganga dynasty: Kalinga Magha	Defeat: Magha’s forces sacked Polonnaruwa, tortured and deposed Parakrama Pandya II, and launched a campaign of widespread structural and cultural destruction. They heavily ransacked Buddhist monasteries, destroyed centuries of historical libraries, and forced the native Sinhalese nobility to permanently abandon the Rajarata basin. Magha established a tyrannical rule over the north that lasted over two decades.
Transitional period (1232–1592)
First Tambralinga invasion of Dambadeniya (1247)	Kingdom of Dambadeniya: Parakramabahu II	Tambralinga: Chandrabhanu	Defeat Main article: Dambadeniya–Tambralinga wars
First Pandyan invasion of Dambadeniya (1258)	Kingdom of Dambadeniya: Parakramabahu II	Pandya dynasty: Jatavarman Sundara Pandyan I	Defeat Main article: Pandyan–Sinhalese wars
Second Tambralinga invasion of Dambadeniya (1262)	Kingdom of Dambadeniya: Parakramabahu II	Tambralinga: Chandrabhanu	Defeat Main article: Dambadeniya–Tambralinga wars
Second Pandyan invasion of Dambadeniya (1263)	Kingdom of Dambadeniya: Parakramabahu II	Pandya dynasty: Jatavarman Vira Pandyan II	Defeat Main article: Pandyan–Sinhalese wars
Third Pandyan invasion of Dambadeniya (1270)	Kingdom of Dambadeniya: Parakramabahu II	Pandya dynasty: Jatavarman Vira Pandyan II	Defeat Main article: Pandyan–Sinhalese wars
Forth Pandyan invasion of Dambadeniya (~1277)	Kingdom of Dambadeniya: Bhuvanekabahu I	Pandya dynasty: Maravarman Kulasekara Pandyan I; Kulasekara Cinkaiariyan	Defeat Main article: Pandyan–Sinhalese wars: Maravarman Kulasekara Pandyan I sent an expedition to Sri Lanka under his minister Kulasekara Cinkaiariyan Aryacakravarti in the late 1270s, defeating Savakanmaindan, a tributary to the Pandyans on the Jaffna kingdom.; This expedition plundered the fortress of Subhagiri (Yapahuwa) and returned with the Relic of the tooth of the Buddha.; Bhuvanekabahu I's successor Parakramabahu III went on a personal embassy to Kulasekaran's court and persuaded him to return the relic.; Jaffna kingdom was under Pandyan suzerainty for the next twenty years and only regained its independence during the Pandyan Civil war of 1308-1323 that followed Kulasekaran's death.
1360 Jaffna invasion of Gampola (1360)	Kingdom of Gampola	Jaffna kingdom	Main article: Sinhalese–Jaffna wars
Vijayanagara invasion of Gampola (1385)	Kingdom of Gampola	Vijayanagara Empire	Main article: Sinhalese–Vijayanagara wars
1391 Jaffna invasion of Gampola (1391)	Kingdom of Gampola	Jaffna kingdom	Main article: Sinhalese–Jaffna wars
Ming–Kotte War (1411)	Kingdom of Kotte	Ming China (Kingdom of Kotte) Parakramabahu VI	Ming victory: Overthrow of Vira Alakesvara; Ascension of Parakramabahu VI
1435 Vijayanagara invasion of Kotte (1435)	Kingdom of Kotte	Vijayanagara Empire	Main article: Sinhalese–Vijayanagara wars
1437 Vijayanagara invasion of Kotte (1437)	Kingdom of Kotte	Vijayanagara Empire	Main article: Sinhalese–Vijayanagara wars
1440 Vijayanagara invasion of Kotte (1440)	Kingdom of Kotte	Vijayanagara Empire	Main article: Sinhalese–Vijayanagara wars
Kotte conquest of Jaffna (1449–1454)	Kingdom of Kotte	Jaffna kingdom Vanni chieftaincies (until 1450); Supported by: Vijayanagar Empire	Kotte victory Main article: Sinhalese–Jaffna wars: Jaffna kingdom captured by Kotte; Parakramabahu VI appoints Prince Sapumal as representative of Kotte, who would reign for about 17 years
Kotte invasion of Vijayanagara (1456)	Kingdom of Kotte	Vijayanagara Empire	Victory Main article: Sinhalese–Vijayanagara wars
1518 Kotte–Portuguese War (1518)	Kingdom of Kotte	Portuguese Empire	Main article: Sinhalese–Portuguese Wars
1521 Kotte–Portuguese War (1521)	Kingdom of Kotte	Portuguese Empire	Main article: Sinhalese–Portuguese Wars
Kotte–Portuguese invasion of Kandy (1550)	Kingdom of Kotte; Portuguese Empire	Kingdom of Kandy	Main articles: Wars of Kotte Succession and Sinhalese–Portuguese Wars
Portuguese–Sitawaka War (1551)	Kingdom of Sitawaka	Portuguese Empire	Main articles: Wars of Kotte Succession and Sinhalese–Portuguese Wars
1560 Portuguese invasion of Jaffna (1560)	Jaffna kingdom	Portuguese Empire	Portuguese victory Main article: Portuguese conquest of Jaffna
1574–78 Portuguese attack on Sitawaka (1574–78)	Kingdom of Sitawaka	Portuguese Empire	Main articles: Wars of Kotte Succession and Sinhalese–Portuguese Wars: Portuguese destruction of the Kelaniya Raja Maha Vihara (~1575)
1591 Portuguese invasion of Jaffna (1591)	Jaffna kingdom	Portuguese Empire	Portuguese victory Main article: Portuguese conquest of Jaffna
Kandyan period (1592–1815)
First Kandyan–Dutch War (1670–1675 (Note: It can be argued that the wars started in 1665 because that what the Dutch started invading but 1670 is when it was officially war and the first major offensive by the Kandyans took place.))	Kingdom of Kandy: Rajasinha II; Kingdom of France: Jacob Blaquet de la Haye	Dutch Republic: Dutch East India Company; Rijckloff van Goens	Dutch victory Main article: Kandyan–Dutch wars: French expelled from all occupied territories; Expansion of Dutch Ceylon; Offensives by Rajasinha II repelled
Second Kandyan–Dutch War (1764–1766)	Kingdom of Kandy: Kirti Sri Rajasinha	Dutch Republic: Dutch East India Company; Lubbert Jan van Eck	Dutch victory Main article: Kandyan–Dutch wars: Treaty of Batticaloa; Dutch occupation of Kandy until the Treaty of Batticaloa; All coastal regions ceded to the Dutch
Vanniyar Rebellion (1782)	Vanni chieftaincies Kingdom of Kandy	Dutch Republic	Victory: Vanni region liberated from Dutch rule
First Anglo-Kandyan War (1803–1805)	Kingdom of Kandy: Sri Vikrama Rajasinha	United Kingdom; Kandyan opposition	Victory Main article: Kandyan Wars
Second Anglo-Kandyan War (1815)	Kingdom of Kandy: Sri Vikrama Rajasinha	United Kingdom	British victory Main article: Kandyan Wars: End of the Kandyan monarchy
British Ceylon period (1815–1948)
Third Anglo-Kandyan War (1817–1818)	Kingdom of Kandy: Keppetipola Disawe; Madugalle Nilame; Ehelepola Nilame	United Kingdom: Robert Brownrigg	British victory Main article: Kandyan Wars
Second Boer War (1899–1902)	United Kingdom and Empire: Cape Colony; Natal Colony; Basutoland; Bechuanaland; Rhodesia; India; Ceylon; Canada; New Zealand; Australia (Note: Before Federation in 1901, Australian involvement in the war consisted of forces from the following separate colonies: New South Wales; Western Australia; Tasmania; South Australia; Victoria; Queensland)	South African Republic; Orange Free State: Cape Boers; Foreign volunteers: (Note: Larger numbers of volunteers came from the Netherlands, Germany and Sweden-Norway. Smaller forces came from Ireland, Italy, Congress Poland, France, Australia, Belgium, Russia, the United States, Denmark, Austria-Hungary, and Greece.): Netherlands; Germany; Sweden–Norway; Ireland; Italy; Poland; France; Australia; Belgium; Russian Empire; Georgia; United States; Denmark; Austria-Hungary; Greece	British victory: Conquest and dissolution of the South African Republic and Orange Free State; Treaty of Vereeniging; The Boer republics are absorbed into the British Empire in accordance with the Treaty of Vereeniging.
World War I (1914–1918)	Allied Powers: France; United Kingdom; and Empire: Australia; Canada; Ceylon; Egypt; Newfoundland; New Zealand; India; South Africa; Russia (until 1917) (Note: The Russian Empire during 1914–1917, the Russian Republic during 1917. The Bolsheviks signed an armistice followed by a separate peace shortly after their armed seizure of power.); Italy (from 1915); United States (from 1917); Japan; and others ...	Central Powers: Germany; Austria-Hungary; Ottoman Empire; Bulgaria (from 1915); and others ...	Allied victory (see Aftermath of World War I)
World War II (1939–1945 (Note: While various other dates have been proposed as the date on which World War II began or ended, this is the period most frequently cited.))	Allied Powers: British Empire; British Ceylon; France; Poland; Belgium; Netherlands; Luxembourg; Czechoslovakia; Norway; Kingdom of Greece; Kingdom of Yugoslavia; Soviet Union; United States; Nepal; Union of South Africa; Brazil; China	Axis powers: Nazi Germany; Kingdom of Italy; Hungary; Empire of Japan; Kingdom of Bulgaria; Croatia; Kingdom of Romania; Manchukuo; Mengjiang; Finland; Thailand; Vichy France	Allied victory

== Civil wars and internal conflicts ==
Legend
Victory
Defeat
Other result
Ongoing

Conflict	Sri Lanka (and allies)	Opponents	Results
Pre-Anuradhapura period (543–377 BCE)
Pandukabhaya's rebellion (458–439 BCE)	Anuradhapura Kingdom	Anuradhapura Kingdom	Rebellion: Pandukabhaya's victory: Prince Tissa was not archknowledged universally as the Sinhalese king, remained as regent during the rebellion, which ended with the Battle of Labugamaka where with the aid of the Yakkhas and others, Pandukabhaya slew eight of his uncles who were against him.
Manavanna's First Restoration War (660s)	Anuradhapura Kingdom; Supported by: Pallava dynasty	Anuradhapura Kingdom	Civil war: Aborted
Manavanna's Second Restoration War (684)	Anuradhapura Kingdom; Supported by: Pallava dynasty	Anuradhapura Kingdom	Civil war: Manavanna's victory
Polonnaruwa period (1017–1232)
Velakkara revolt (1084)	Polonnaruwa Kingdom	Polonnaruwa Kingdom	Rebellion: Polonnaruwa victory
First Polonnaruwa War of Succession (1110–1153)	Polonnaruwa Kingdom	Polonnaruwa Kingdom	Civil war:
Queen Sugala rebellion (1157)	Polonnaruwa Kingdom	Principality of Ruhuna	Rebellion: Polonnaruwa victory
Ruhuna Rebellion (1160)	Polonnaruwa Kingdom	Principality of Ruhuna	
Rajarata Rebellion (1168)	Polonnaruwa Kingdom	Rajarata	
Second Polonnaruwa War of Succession (1186–87)	Polonnaruwa Kingdom	Polonnaruwa Kingdom	Civil war:
Second Polonnaruwa War of Succession (1186–87)	Polonnaruwa Kingdom	Polonnaruwa Kingdom	Civil war:
Transitional period (1232–1592)
Sinhala sange revolt (1470s)	Kingdom of Kotte		Rebellion: Led to Kandyan independence in 1469
Vijayabā Kollaya (1521)	Kingdom of Kotte	Kingdom of Kotte	Succession crisis: Weerasuriya revolt (1521)
1536–39 Kotte–Sitawaka War (1536–39)	Kingdom of Kotte	Kingdom of Sitawaka	Succession crisis: Main article: Wars of Kotte Succession
1547 Kandy–Sitawaka War (1547)	Kingdom of Kandy	Kingdom of Sitawaka	Succession crisis: Main article: Wars of Kotte Succession
1552 Kandy–Sitawaka War (1552)	Kingdom of Kandy	Kingdom of Sitawaka	Succession crisis: Main article: Wars of Kotte Succession
Revolt of Veediya Bandara (1553)			Revolt: Main article: Wars of Kotte Succession
1555–65 Kotte–Sitawaka War (1555–65)	Kingdom of Kotte	Kingdom of Sitawaka	Succession crisis: Main article: Wars of Kotte Succession: Conversion of Dharmapala (1557); Battle of Denipitiya (1557); Siege of Kotte (1557–1558); Battle of Mapitigama (1559); Battle of Mulleriyawa (1559); Siege of Kotte (1562–1565); Kandyan raid on the Seven Korales (1564); Fall of Kotte (1565)
1574 Sitawaka attack on Kandy (1574)	Kingdom of Kandy	Kingdom of Sitawaka	Succession crisis: Main article: Wars of Kotte Succession
Sitawaka conquest of Kandy (1581–1592)	Kingdom of Kandy	Kingdom of Sitawaka	Succession crisis: Main article: Wars of Kotte Succession: Battle of Balana (1582); Revolt of Wijayakon Mudaliyar (1592)
Wars of Kotte Succession (1521–1658)	Kingdom of Kotte; Portuguese Empire Dutch East India Company (from 1638)	Kingdom of Sitawaka; Kingdom of Raigama; Kingdom of Kandy; Jaffna kingdom Denmark-Norway (1619–1622); Supported by: Zamorin of Calicut; Kingdom of Tanjore; Vanni chieftaincies	Victory: End of the kingdoms of Kotte, Sitawaka, Jaffna and Raigama; Establishment then destruction of Portuguese Ceylon; Incorporation of parts of Kotte and Sitawaka into the Kingdom of Kandy; Capture of Colombo, Galle, Jaffna, Raigama and much of Sitawaka by the Dutch and the establishment of Dutch Ceylon
British Ceylon period (1815–1948)
Matale rebellion (1848)	United Kingdom: British Ceylon	Kandyan rebels	Rebellion: British Ceylon victory
Sri Lanka since 1948
1971 JVP insurrection (1971)	Ceylon: (Dominion of Ceylon) Sri Lankan Coalition (from 15 May); SLFP; CCP; LSSP; Military intervention: India; Pakistan; Soviet Union	Janatha Vimukthi Peramuna; Supported by: North Korea; Albania (arms support); China (alleged); ASBPI; CCP (Maoist) (alleged); Diplomatic support: South Yemen	Internal conflict: Ceylonese government victory: Rebel leaders are captured and remaining members surrender; Ceylonese government re-establishes control of the entire island; Expulsion of North Korean diplomats; JVP controls the Southern and Sabaragamuwa Provinces for several weeks
Sri Lankan civil war (1983–2009)	Sri Lanka; India (1987–1990)	Liberation Tigers of Tamil Eelam; Other Tamil militant groups	Civil war: Sri Lankan government victory: Liberation Tigers of Tamil Eelam militarily defeated; Sri Lankan government reestablishes control over the entire island; Collapse of the Tamil Eelam de facto quasi-state; Tamil National Alliance drops its demand for a separate Tamil state; Transnational Government of Tamil Eelam established
1987–1989 JVP insurrection (1987–1989)	Sri Lanka; India; Pro-government paramilitaries: Eagles of the Central Hills; Black Cats; ...and at least 8 other minor groups; Anti-JVP leftist militias: Peoples Revolutionary Red Army; Vikalpa Kandayama	Janatha Vimukthi Peramuna: Deshapremi Janatha Viyaparaya; Patriotic People's Armed Troops	Internal conflict: Sri Lankan government victory: Emergency conditions in Southwestern and Central provinces lifted; Insurgency declines following the fall of the Eastern Bloc

== Minor conflicts ==
Legend
Victory
Defeat
Other result
Ongoing

=== Military operations ===
Conflict	Sri Lanka (and allies)	Opponents	Results
Anuradhapura period (377 BCE–1017)
Battle of Vatapi (642)	Pallava dynasty Anuradhapura Kingdom: Prince Manavanna	Chalukya Empire	Pallava Victory Main article: Chalukya–Pallava wars: Prince Manavamma helped Pallava King Narasimhavarman I defeat the Chalukyas. In return, Narasinhavarman supplied Manavamma with an army to successfully invade Anuradhapura and challenge Unhanagara Hatthadatha.
Sri Lanka since 1948
Operation Yukthiya (2023–present)	Sri Lanka: Sri Lanka Police; Special Task Force; Sri Lanka Army	Drug dealers	Ongoing
Operation Prosperity Guardian (2023–present)	Sri Lanka Navy; United States Navy; Royal Navy; Australian Navy; Bahraini Naval Force; Canadian Navy; Danish Navy; Finnish Navy; Hellenic Navy; Dutch Navy; New Zealand Navy; Norwegian Navy; Singaporean Navy Supported by: Seychelles Coast Guard	Houthi Yemen: Houthis	Ongoing: SLNS Gajabahu completes its maiden patrol of the Bab el-Mandeb Strait and is set to return to the island; Government of Sri Lanka confirms that future patrols would take place

=== Peacekeeping ===
Conflict	Sri Lanka (and allies)	Opponents	Results
United Nations Interim Force in Lebanon (1978–present)	Sri Lanka	Lebanon	Ongoing
United Nations Stabilisation Mission in Haiti (2004–present)	Sri Lanka	Haiti	Ongoing
United Nations Mission in the Central African Republic and Chad (2007–2010)	Sri Lanka	Central African Republic; Chad	Ended
United Nations Multidimensional Integrated Stabilization Mission in Mali (2013–present)	Sri Lanka	Mali	Ongoing
