= Dambadeniya–Tambralinga wars =

13th c. military conflicts

Malayan invasions of Sri Lanka occurred in the mid-13th century, when the Malayan ruler Chandrabhanu Sridhamaraja of Tambralinga, invaded Sri Lanka twice during the reign of king Parakramabahu II of Dambadeniya. Both invasions were successfully repulsed by the Kingdom of Dambadeniya.

== Background ==
The Rajarata civilization of Sri Lanka ended with the fall of Polonnaruwa to Kalinga Magha, a conqueror from the Eastern Ganga dynasty with Tamil Army. Kalinga Magha's brutal reign in Polonnaruwa caused a massive human migration and destruction from the region of Rajarata to the South. Not long after, several political states emerged in the southern region, and the kingdom of Dambadeniya in Maya Rata was one of them. Parakramabahu II, who became the second monarch of Dambadeniya in 1236, was strengthening his army during the time to defeat Magha from Southern Sri Lanka. After that Magha had retreated to the Jaffna Kingdom and ruled until the throne was secured by Chandrabhanu,

== First invasion ==
While preparing for the battle with Kalinga Magha, Chandrabhanu, a Javaka or 'Malayan ruler' from the South-east Tambralinga kingdom (present-day Thailand and Malaysia) invaded Sri Lanka in 1244 all of a sudden, with a host armed with blow-pipes and poisoned arrows. He may have been a sea-pirate, and descended on the Island later on. It is unknown why Chandrabhanu actually wanted to invade the country, but it is most accepted that he invaded Sri Lanka with the aim of claiming the sacred tooth relic of the Buddha in Sri Lanka. To handle the unexpected Malayan an invasion, Prince Veerabahu, the nephew of Parakramabahu II was sent by force to oust Chandrabhanu.

== Second invasion ==
Chandrabhanu was defeated, but he was able to move North (present-day Jaffna) and secure the Tamil throne for several years. Not long after, he began setting up a plan to re-invade Dambadeniya. He declared himself as the king of Jaffna and adopted the regnal name 'Srīdḥarmarāja'.

Chandrabhanu's reign in Jaffna gave the opportunity to the Pandya Empire to intervene with territorial control in the North, and thus the Pandya king Sadayavarman Sundara Pandyan invaded and Chandrabhanu had to submit to Pandya rule as a vassal.

However, despite the invasions, he was able to spend his time in religious and pious works. According to contemporary records, he held a convocation to reform the Buddhist priesthood, and repaired and constructed Buddhist temples throughout the region.

Due to these activities, this cunning king was soon able to win the hearts of the Sinhalese and Tamils living in the North. Taking advantage of this opportunity, King Chandrabhanu gathered a large army from the north and invaded Dambadeniya to capture the Tooth Relic.

However, King Parakramabahu II mobilized an army in favor of Jatavarman Veera Pandyan, the emperor of the Pandyan kingdom and fought with Chandrabhanu. According to historical records, King Chandrabhanu was defeated and killed in the war.

== Aftermath ==
Veera Pandyan proceeded to plant the Pandyan bull victory flag at Koneswaram temple, Konamalai. The Kudumiyamalai Prasasti of the eleventh year of Veera Pandyan I reign relates the riches this conquest brought the Pandyans. Savakanmaindan, who had resisted Jatavarman Veera Pandyan I's forces in Jaffna Patnam, inherited the Jaffna throne upon his father's death and proclaimed himself the king of Jaffna in 1262.

Savakanmaindan professed initial contumacy to Pandyan rule but eventually submitted. He was rewarded and allowed to retain control of the Jaffna kingdom while Sundara Pandyan remained the regions overlord. Marco Polo, describing Sundara Pandyan's empire as the richest in the world, visited the Jaffna kingdom upon docking at Trincomalee, and described the locals under the rule of king Sendemain as mostly naked and feeding on rice and meat. The land was abundant with rubies and other precious stones, although at this stage Savakanmaindan was not paying tributes to the Pandyans. When Savakamaindan embarked on another invasion of the south, the Pandyas under Maravarman Kulasekara Pandyan again invaded and defeated his forces in the late 1270s. However, to further the Tamil hard power in the region, they eventually installed one of their ministers in charge of the invasion, Kulasekara Cinkaiariyan, an Aryacakravarti as the King. In the local Tamil language, all South East Asians are known as Javar or Javanese. There are number of place names in the Jaffna peninsula which pertains to its South East Asian connections. Chavakacheri means a Javanese settlement. Chavahakottai means a Javanese fort all alluding to Chandrabhanu's brief rule in the north.

Jaffna then existed as a tributary state to the Pandyas and received independence in 1323, after the Pandyan Empire was annexed by the Delhi Sultanate and subsequently by the Vijayanagaras. It continued to exist as an independent kingdom until 1619.

Meanwhile, in Southeast Asia, Tambralinga was annexed in the late-13th century by the emerging Ayutthaya Kingdom, with the region being renamed as Nakhon Si Thammarat. The area would stay under Thai influence for centuries after this conquest, being a province of the succeeding Rattanakosin Kingdom and modernized Kingdom of Thailand.

== See also ==
- Sri Lankan Malays
- Savakanmaindan
- Relic of the tooth of the Buddha
