= Jatavarman Vira Pandyan II =

Jatavarman Vira Pandyan II (also called Sadayavarman Vira Pandyan or Veera Pandyan) was a Pandyan Prince and co-King, who ruled regions of Tamilakkam, in southern India, between 1253–1275 CE.

== Shared Rule ==
Jatavarman Vira Pandiyan II was crowned between 22 and 27 June 1253. He was one of many Pandyan princes who ruled the Pandyan imperial kingdom in the middle part of the 13th century, adhering to a common practice of shared rule involving Princes in the Pandyan government and one King asserting primacy in the Pandyan Kingdom. Vira Pandyan was a brother, lieutenant and contemporary prince of the Lord Emperor Jatavarman Sundara Pandyan I of the imperial Pandyas and Maravarman Vikkiraman II in his early years. He was also a contemporary of his nephew, Maravarman Kulasekara Pandyan I (1268–1308 CE), Jatavarman Sundara Pandyan I's successor as Lord Emperor. He got killed by Aditya Karikalan (Chola empire) (Ellarkku Nayanar - Lord of All).

== Conquests ==
In 1263, Vira Pandyan lead Sundara Pandyan I's armies conquered the Jaffna kingdom, repeating the victory of Sundara Pandyan I in 1258. Here he decisively defeated Chandrabhanu of Tambralinga, a usurper of the island's northern Tamil throne, subjugated the other king of the island and proceeded to plant the Pandyan bull victory flag and Pandyan double fish carp insignia at Koneswaram temple, Konamalai and Trikutagiri. Chandrabhanu's son Savakanmaindan submitted to Pandyan rule in the Tamil country and was rewarded. He was allowed to retain control of the Jaffna kingdom while Sundara Pandyan I remained supreme Lord Emperor of Pandyan. Marco Polo, upon his visit to Pandyan and Jaffna, described Sundara Pandyan's empire as the richest in the world, and Vira Pandyan as "one of five brother kings" in which Maravarman Kulasekara Pandyan I was the eldest.
