= Chandrabhanu =

Chandrabhanu Sridhamaraja

King of Tambralinga
- Reign: 1230–1262
- Coronation: 1230
- Successor: Savakanmaindan

King of Jaffna
- Reign: 1255–1262
- Predecessor: Kalinga Magha
- Successor: Savakanmaindan
- Born: Tambralinga
- Died: 1262
- House: Padmavamsa (Lotus) dynasty
- Religion: Buddhism

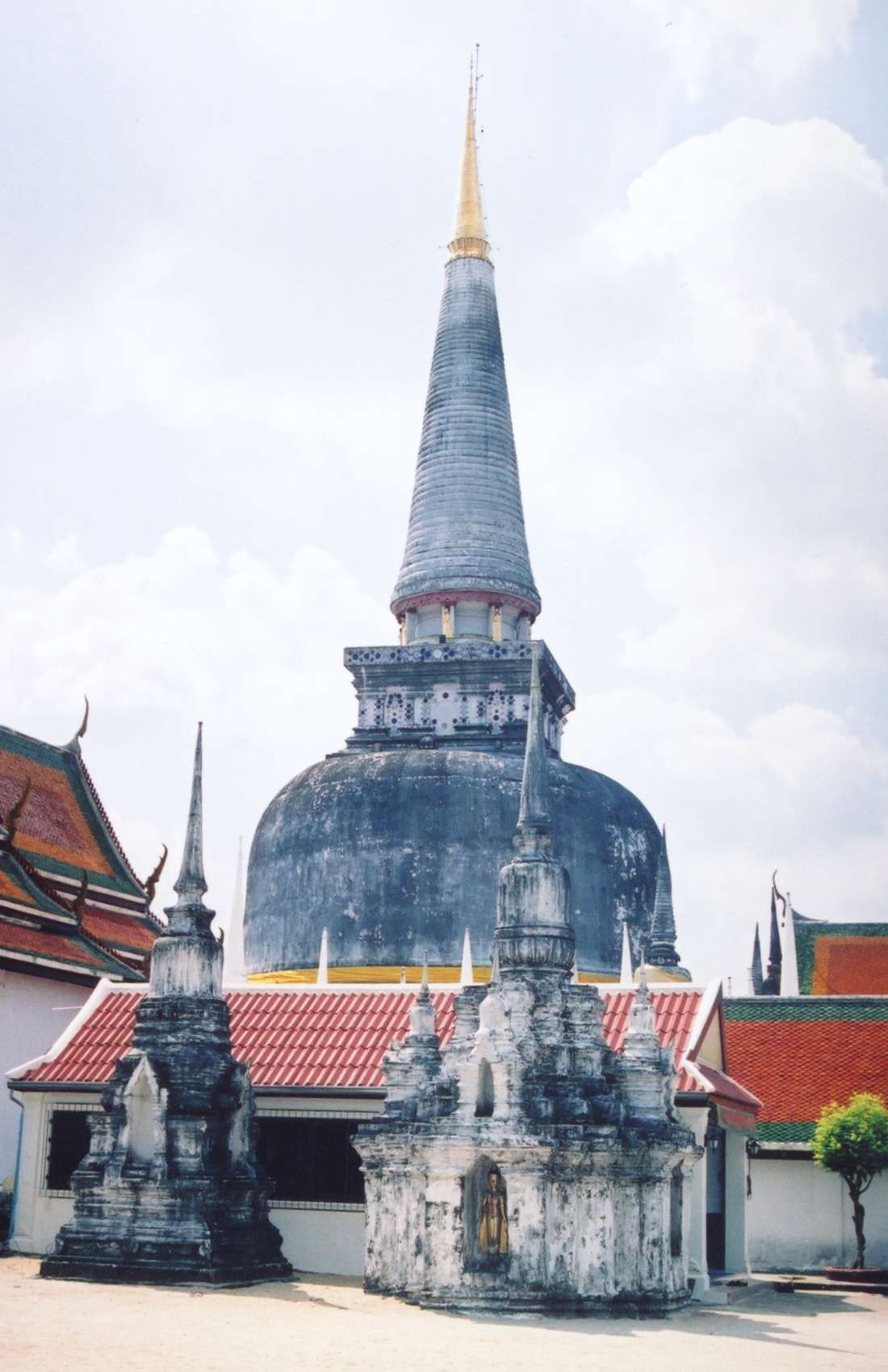
Phrae Boromadhatu stupa

Chandrabhanu (Tamil: சந்திரபானு, Thai: จันทรภาณุ ศรีธรรมราช; reigned from 1255 to 1262) or Chandrabhanu Sridhamaraja was the King of Tambralinga Kingdom in present-day Thailand, Malaysia and the Jaffna Kingdom in northern Sri Lanka. A Javaka, he was known to have ruled from during the period of 1230 until 1262.

He was also known for building a well-known Buddhist stupa in southern Thailand. In 1247 he sent an expedition to the island ostensibly to acquire the Buddhist relic from the island. Sinhalese King Parakramabahu II sent his nephew Prince Veerabahu to handle the unexpected Malay invasion. He was able to defeat Chandrabhanu. But Chandrabhanu's forces, using poison darts, were able to occupy the Jaffna kingdom, the northern part of the island in 1255. Repeated attempts to conquer the rest of the island ensued. In 1258 his forces faced an invasion of the island by the forces of the Pandyan Dynasty commanded by Jatavarman Sundara Pandyan I, and Chandrabhanu submitted to Pandyan rule, bringing the Jaffna kingdom under Pandyan suzerainty. From 1262–1264 Tambralinga forces, using Chola and Pandyan soldiers commanded by Chandrabhanu's son Savakanmaindan and two Sinhalese princes were defeated by the Pandyans led in the invasion by Jatavarman Vira Pandyan I.

In 1270, Savakanmaindan, kept on the Jaffna throne under Pandyan suzerainty attempted to invade the south of the island once again, and was defeated decisively by the Pandyans under Maravarman Kulasekara Pandyan I by the late 1270s. He spent more than 30 years in his attempt to conquer Sri Lanka. He was eventually defeated by the forces of the Pandyan Dynasty from Tamil Nadu (in present-day South India) in 1262 and was killed by the brother of the south Indian Emperor Jatavarman Sundara Pandyan.

== Tambralinga ==
According to the inscription no.24 found at wat Hua-wieng (Hua-wieng temple) in Chaiya near to Nakhon Si Thammaraj, Chandrabhanu is a ruler of Tambralinga and was of Padmavamsa (lotus dynasty). He began to reign in 1230, he had built the Phrae Boromadhatu a buddhist stupa in Nakhon Si Thammaraj to hold the Buddha's relic.

== First invasion of Sri Lanka ==
It was recorded by the Mahawamsa, the historic chronicle of Sri Lanka to have invaded Sri Lanka in 1247 in search of Buddha's relict that Sri Lanka already had. According to Sri Lankan sources he was a Javaka chieftain and a sea pirate from the kingdom of Tambralinga. Although King Parakramabahu II (1236–70) from the Sinhalese Kingdom of Dambadeniya was able to defeat him, Chandrabhanu moved north and secured the Tamil throne for himself around 1255. Jatavarman Sundara Pandyan of the Pandyan Empire in Tamilakkam intervened in 1258 and made Chandrabhanu submit to Pandyan rule, annually offering precious jewels and elephants in tribute. A second attempt by Chandrabhanu to invade from the north prompted the south Indian Prince Jatavarman Veera Pandyan, brother of emperor Jatavarman Sundara Pandyan to intervene in 1262–1264. Chandrabhanu was killed in the battle. Veera Pandyan proceeded to plant the Pandyan bull victory flag at Koneswaram temple, Konamalai. Savakanmaindan, son of Chandrabhanu, inherited the northern Tamil throne upon his father's death.

== Chandrabhanu's son ==
Chandrabhanu's son Savakanmaindan submitted to Pandyan rule and was rewarded, he was allowed to retain control of the Jaffna kingdom while Sundara Pandyan remained king of Pandyan. Marco Polo, describing Sundara Pandyan's empire as the richest in the world, visited the Jaffna kingdom upon docking at Trincomalee, and described the locals under king Sendemain's rule as mostly naked and feeding on rice and meat. The land was abundant with rubies and other precious stones, although by this stage Savakanmaindan had stopped paying tributes to the Pandyans. When Savakamaindan embarked on an invasion of the south, the Pandyan Dynasty under King Maravarman Kulasekara Pandyan I again invaded and defeated his forces in the late 1270s. However, to further the power of Tamil hard power in the region, they eventually installed one of their ministers in charge of the invasion, Kulasekara Cinkaiariyan, an Aryacakravarti as the King. In the local Tamil language, all South East Asians are known as Javar or Javanese. There are number of place names in the Jaffna peninsula which pertains to its South East Asian connections. Chavakacheri means a Javanese settlement. Chavahakottai means a Javanese fort all alluding to Chandrabhanu's brief rule in the north.

== Notes ==
Chandrabhanu House of Padmavamsa Born: ? Died: 1262
Regnal titles
Unknown	King of Tambralinga; 1230–1262	Succeeded by Savakanmaindan
Preceded by Kalinga Magha	King of Jaffna; 1255–1262	Succeeded by Savakanmaindan
