= Tambralinga =

2nd–13th-century Indianised kingdom on the Malay Peninsula

Tambralinga Tāmbraliṅga
- c. 2nd century CE–1277
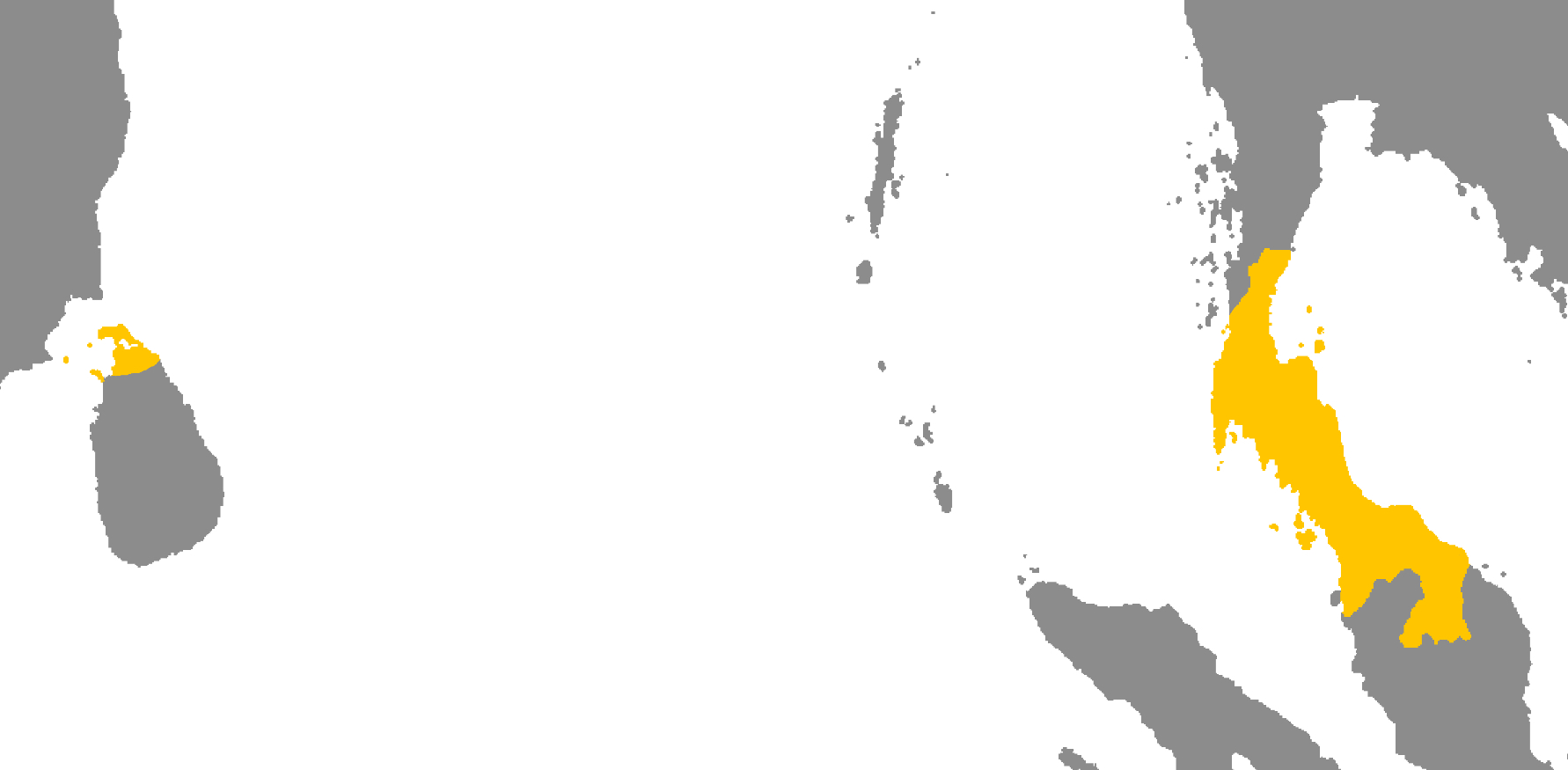
- Tambralinga at their largest extent in 1244 after the Sri Lankan conquest
- Capital: Nakhon Si Thammarat
- Common languages: Austronesian languages, Austroasiatic languages Old Mon (from 7th century); Old Khmer, Sanskrit (in inscriptions)
- Religion: Hinduism, Buddhism
- Government: Monarchy
- King
  - 1230–1262: Chandrabhanu
  - 1263–1272: Sri Dharmasokaraja V
- History
  - First mentioned in the Mahaniddesa: c. 2nd century CE
  - Tambralinga-Lavo-Haripunchai war: 927
  - First mentioned in medieval Chinese sources: 970
  - Formed Srivijaya Empire (Note: Due to the absence of conclusive evidence of long-term Srivijaya control of Tambralinga, O. W. Wolters suggests that Tambralinga was largely an independent polity, which had close relationships with Angkor. Leonard Andaya additionally proposes that the previous perception of Srivijaya as the dominant maritime Southeast Asian empire should be refined.): 775–969
  - Late Independent: 970–1277
  - Srivijaya-Angkor war: 1003
  - Cholas attacked Srivijaya: 1025
  - Vassal of Pagan?: 1060 or 1130 – 1176
  - Tambralinga invaded Sri Lanka: 1247
  - Fall of Tambralinga: 1277
  - Split up by Singasari in south and Sukhothai in north: 1278
Preceded by
Srivijaya
Pan Pan
Takkola
Succeeded by
Nakhon Si Thammarat
- Today part of: Thailand, Malaysia

Political entities in Peninsula Siam in early first millennium.

Tambralinga or Ho-ling was an Indianised kingdom located on the Malay Peninsula (primarily in modern-day Southern Thailand), existing at least from the 2nd to 13th centuries CE. The ethnicity of the kingdom is not known with any certainty, though it may have had Austronesian, Khmer, or Mon associations. It was possibly under the influence of Srivijaya for some time, but it later became independent from it or their relationship may have generally been that of allies rather than conqueror and vassal. The name had been forgotten until scholars recognized Tambralinga as Nakhon Si Thammarat (Nagara Sri Dharmaraja). In Sanskrit and Prakrit, tām(b)ra means "copper", "copper-coloured" or "red" and linga means "symbol" or "creation", typically representing the divine energy of Shiva.

Tambralinga first sent an embassy to China under the Song dynasty in 1001. In the 12th century it may or may not have been under the suzerainty of the Burmese Pagan Kingdom and a kingdom of Sri Lanka. At its height in the mid-13th century, under King Chandrabhanu, Tambralinga was independent, regrouping and consolidating its power and even invading Sri Lanka. By the end of the 13th century, Tambralinga was recorded in Siamese history as Nakhon Si Thammarat, under the suzerainty of the Tai Sukhothai Kingdom.

== Location ==
In his 13th-century work Zhu Fan Zhi, Chinese historian Zhao Rugua mentions the state Danmaling (Tan-ma-ling, 單馬令), describing it as a vassal of Srivijaya. The same work lists Tambralinga among the dependencies of Angkor for 1225. The History of Song gives a similar account under the name Tan-mei-liu. Briggs, in a study whose subject is the reach of the Khmer Empire over the peninsula, read that notice together with the Ling-wai-tai ta as evidence of dependency. On his account Tambralinga was a dependency of the Khmer Empire throughout the reign of Jayavarman VII (r.1181–1218). David K. Wyatt distrusts that notice, observing that he cannot see how Angkor might have controlled Tambralinga in that year without also controlling Grahi (Chaiya in modern Surat Thani province), and that Chinese compilations of the kind sometimes copied earlier writers uncritically. He also surveyed the sixteen dated inscriptions of 1168 to 1219. Those from Grahi show no indication of Angkorian political or administrative power, though he added that such an absence is not conclusive. Whether Danmaling can be identified with Tambralinga is dubious; sinologist Roderich Ptak proposes instead to locate it in the Tembeling region of Pahang.

An indigenous source of Tambralinga history is an inscription dating to 1183, written in Old Khmer, engraved on the base of a bronze Buddha statue found at Wat Hua Wiang in Chaiya District, Surat Thani Province. It gives an impression of the political situation of Tambralinga in the late-twelfth century. Michael Vickery read the Khmer documents of the Phatthalung and Nakhon Si Thammarat region as evidence that the language was still spoken there. They are grants of land and slaves rather than religious texts, and they are not in the standard Khmer of Cambodia and Ayutthaya, either in language or in script, but in a form peculiar to the peninsula. He also held that the peninsula was probably not yet Thai-speaking in the 13th century, citing Anthony Diller's estimate that Thai speakers had been there somewhat over 500 years. On Prasert na Nagara's revision of that figure to about 700 years, Thai settlement would still only begin at the end of the 13th century. Another important source is a Sanskrit inscription ascribed to King Chandrabhanu of Tambralinga, dated 1230. It gives the king the epithet "Śrī Dharmarāja", which is considered a piece of evidence for the identification of Tambralinga with Nakhon Si Thammarat (Nagara Śrī Dharmarāja in Sanskrit).

== History ==
=== Early coastal polities: 5th century BCE – 5th century CE ===
Present-day peninsular Thailand has long been considered an important area in social interaction as the gateway between the South China Sea and the India Ocean since the protohistoric period (c. 500 BCE–500 CE). Hermann Kulke (1990) suggests that complex pre-Indianized political entities in present-day peninsular Thailand existed before the first millennium CE and developed into centralized polities around the mid-first millennium CE through Indianization, by adopting Indic ideologies to extend power as well as institutionalizing god-king status and dynamic traditions. Tambralinga was one of the significant centralized polities in the area that was mentioned by Indian literature of the 2nd century CE. The Tamali of the Pali Mahā Niddesa has been linked to Tambraliṅga on the eastern shore of the peninsula, a designation that may have embraced a stretch of coast including Chaiya and Chumphon rather than a single settlement. Scholars have assumed that Tambralinga was situated near modern Nakhon Si Thammarat (Ligor). The identification appears valid on the text of inscription No. 28, found in Phra Maha That temple at the center of modern Nakhon Si Thammarat. It is engraved with Pallava scripts in Sanskrit language and dated to the 5th century CE, and mentions the Tambralingeshvra meaning the "Siva of Tambralinga" or "Lord of Tambralinga".

However, some scholars who place more emphasis on Chinese records than local inscriptions are inclined to believe that the beginning of Tambralinga as an autonomous polity dates to the 10th or 11th century instead. On that view it was overshadowed before then by Pan Pan, centered on the area around the Bay of Bandon in present-day Surat Thani province.

The region was first under the domination of Funan and then of Chenla from the beginning of the 3rd century until it was conquered by Srivijaya in the latter part of the 8th.

=== Early mandalas: 5th – 10th centuries CE ===
The Chinese Songhuiyaogao chronicle mentions a country named Danliumei (Tan-liu-mei), including many details during the period from 970 to 1070. It gives the impression that the kingdom was an independent state at that time, sending embassies to the court of China under the Song dynasty in 1001, 1016 and 1070. Danliumei is assumed to be a Chinese rendering of Tambralinga, though the location of Danliumei is not precisely described by the chronicles. The chronicle of Ma Duanlin and the Songshi, mention similarly named states, Zhoumeiliu (Chou-mei-liu) and Danmeiliu (Tan-liu-mei) respectively, that are also reported to have sent their first mission to China in 1001, which makes it likely that they refer to the same state.

In this era, Tambralinga consisted of five main mandalas located on the bank of Khlong Tha Khwai, Khlong Tha Chieo – Tha Thon, Khlong Tha Lat, Maying River, and the largest one on the Haad Sai Keao dune, which was speculated to be the center of Tambralinga. Each of these mandalas was formed by several communities in the surrounding area with the shrine of the most sacred site as the center and connected with other mandalas by waterways and land paths. Vaishnavism was the predominant belief system, unlike the Dvaravati culture in central Thailand and the Korat plateau where Hinayana Buddhism was dominant. Two stone images from the Surat Thani end of this coast illustrate the point. A standing four-armed Viṣṇu 1.31 m high, of about the late 6th or early 7th century and now in the Bangkok National Museum (KKH 13), is generally attributed to Wiang Sa, although it was first recorded among the Chantharakasem Palace collections at Ayutthaya rather than in the field. A smaller head 15 cm high from Wat Phra Phikanet in Tha Chana district, usually identified as Viṣṇu and now in the Chaiya National Museum, was dated to the 7th century by Piriya Krairiksh and to the late 7th or early 8th by Michel Jacq-Hergoualc'h. Both belong to the standing, four-armed, mitre-crowned type that had become the standard form for Viṣṇu across much of mainland Southeast Asia by the 7th century. The kings of Tambralinga were institutionalized as Siva-king but the king's power was probably shared by administrative subordinates and his relatives.

The region began receiving the immigrants of the Mon people around the 7th century. According to the legend of Nakhon Si Thammarat, Phraya Sri Thammasokaraj or Norabadi (พญาธรรมาโศกราช (Note: Thammasokaraj, Thammasoka, and similar titles were usually used as honorary titles for kings who significantly promoted and sustained Buddhism and were later used as general titles for the Nakhon Si Thammarat rulers.); พญานรบดี) came from the Mon Hanthawaddy. He and his younger brother Dharanont (ธรนนท์) brought their relatives and 30,000 soldiers, along with two Monks Phra Phutthakhamphien (พระพุทธคัมเภียร) and Phra Phutthasakon (พระพุทธสาคร), south to settle in Khao Chawa Prab (เขาชวาปราบ) in present-day Krabi Province and later relocated to establish Nakhon Si Thammarat.

=== Golden age: 10th – mid 13th centuries ===
==== North expansion: 10th – 11th centuries ====
During the 10th–11th centuries Tambralinga gained independence from Srivijaya by the liberation of King Sujita. It was then strong politically and economically, sending several missions to the Chinese court and even supporting troops to conquer the Lavo Kingdom as well as seizing the throne of the Angkor, two of the great mandalas in that period.

The origin of Sujita (Jivakas) of Angkor remains unclear. Cœdès interprets the term “Jivakas” to mean Javanese (Javaka), possibly indicating the king’s lineage as a native Javanese-Malay descended from the Srivijaya dynasty centered on Java. Meanwhile, Pierre Dupont argues that Jivakas was likely of Angkorian descent, or at least his wife must have been an Angkor princess. Dupont additionally comments that to avoid the loss of Angkorian influences over Lavo in the 925–927 Tambralinga–Lavo–Haripuñjaya wars, Sujita moved the troops north to occupy Lavo before it was taken by the Mon Haripuñjaya. However, Dupont's theory is rebutted by an expert in Srivijaya Studies, Pratum Chumphengphan, who defines that the wars happened before the Angkorians exercised political power over the Menam Valley. Therefore, the conflict between “Lavo–Haripuñjaya” at that time was not yet a fight between the “Angkorian and Mon,” but rather a struggle for power between “Mon of Dvaravati” in the central and northern regions, who were relatives.

During this period, at Angkor's Yaśodharapura to the northeast, since the reign of Candravaṃśa's Jayavarman V of the Bhavapura house (r. 968–1001), the aristocratic families dominated the royal court. The throne then fell into two Tambralinga princes, Udayadityavarman I and Jayavirahvarman, who ruled Angkor from 1001–1011. That period is considered a nine-year civil war between the two brothers and Suryavarman I of the Shailendra dynasty who controlled the east and southern regions and was supported by the Bhavapura house of the overthrown king.

In contrast, according to the Prasat Khna Inscription (K.1312), some scholars believe that Narapativiravarman was Sujita, the successor king of both Tambralinga and Lavo, who gave the throne at Tambralinga to his younger brother, Udayadityavarman I, in 1001. On that reading he then launched a successful campaign to conquer Yaśodharapura and enthroned Jayavirahvarman as a new Angkorian king the following year. In the same year, Udayadityavarman I of Tambralinga/Lavo was replaced by his nephew, a usurper named Suryavarman I or Kampoch, who also allied with the house of the overthrown Angkorian king, Jayavarman V, and waged war against Jayavirahvarman to control Yaśodharapura.

==== Buddhism dominant: 11th–13th centuries ====
After the Sujita dynasty's losses in the war against the Chola empire in 1026, Tambralinga was revived by Padmavamsa (ปัทมวงศ์), a noble clan from the north (the exact location is still disputed, either from Lavo or Inthapat Nakhon (possibly Yaśodharapura) or Hanthawaddy). The influx of people and monks from Sri Lanka was recorded, which made Buddhism the dominant belief in the kingdom.

Thai academic Chanchirayuwat Ratchanee proposes that after losing the war to the Chola Empire in 1026, the center of power in the eastern Siam peninsula was shifted from Chaiya to Nakhon Si Thammarat (Ligor) in 1077, according to the information given to the Chinese court by the diplomat sent in 1168. The previous king's son was enthroned as the new ruler. Gordon Luce speculates that the region was possibly controlled by the Pagan Kingdom from 1060 to 1200. That is recorded in the Dhammarajaka inscription, which gives the southern limits of the kingdom to Takwā (Takua Pa), Salankre (Junk Ceylon?, Phuket) and two other places hardly legible, ending with a city with the suffix nakuiw' (nagara). Meanwhile, D.K. Wyatt said Tambralinga was the vassal of the Pagan Kingdom from 1130–1176, with the agreement of the King of Sri Lanka. However, this claim remains disputed; Michel Jacq-Hergoualc'h speculated that even the polities in the Mergui-Tenasserim region to the north of the Isthmus of Kra most probably enjoyed the status of independent chiefdoms during the period under consideration.

Chinese works of the same period describe the polity under the name Deng liu mei (登流眉). The Lingwai Daida of 1178 lists it among the countries neighbouring Zhenla and singles out its aromatics as the finest of any land overseas, adding that the agarwood for which Zhenla was known came from there and was more fragrant than any other. The Zhu Fan Zhi of 1225 places Deng liu mei west of Zhenla and counts it, with Po si lan, Luo hu (Lavo), San luo and Zhen li fu (Chen Li Fu), among Zhenla's dependent states (屬國). An inscription of 1183 on the base of a bronze Buddha image at Chaiya names a ruler of this region as Kamrateng An Maharaja Sri Mat Trailokyaraja Mauli Bhusanavarmadeva. Chit Phumisak read Kamrateng An as the Angkorian designation for the governor of a subject city rather than for a sovereign. The same style is borne by rulers of Chen Li Fu and Phrip Phri, and whether it marks subordination is disputed; see Chen Li Fu § Relations with Angkor. Walailak Songsiri reads it the other way, as a style taken up from the Khorat Plateau and the Tonlé Sap for formal address to the Chinese court, noting that the more than sixty settlements dependent on Chen Li Fu had rulers of their own who did not bear it.

The same work describes its court and customs. The ruler wore his hair in a topknot dressed with flowers and a red shoulder cloth marked with white. He gave audience in the open, there being no hall of audience. Vessels for food and drink were made of palm leaf, and the hand was used in place of spoon or chopsticks. It records a mountain called Wu-nong (无弄) where the Buddha was held to have manifested after the parinirvana, marked by a bronze image, and gives the local products as cardamom, agarwood, beeswax and thong kwao. Ling-ya-si-jia is said to lie six days and nights by boat from Tan-ma-ling (单马令).

Two further Song works show the polity within Chinese commercial and diplomatic routine rather than within the dynastic histories. The Yunlu Manchao lists Deng liu mei among the countries whose trading vessels put in to Fujian, and its compiler remarks that such lands were absent from the historical record and were entered only in the registers of the maritime trade office. The Wenchang Zalu, describing the reception of overseas envoys by the court of ceremonies, gives the name in the variant form Dan liu mei (丹流眉) and enters it tenth among fifteen southern countries, again placed to the west of Zhenla. The Song Huiyao entry for Chen Li Fu, drawn up on that polity's embassies of 1200 to 1205, names T'eng-liu-mei as its neighbour to the south-west, which O. W. Wolters identified with Tambralinga.

The conflict between Kyanzittha of Pagan's grandson and Ceylon's Parakramabahu I to have rights of passage over the Isthmus of Kra was recorded in 1164. This quarrel would continue and be the cause of the invasion of Sri Lanka in 1247 by Chandrabhanu, whose lineage was believed to have moved from the north. Chandrabhanu is of the Padmavamsa (the Lotus Line). This clan has ruled Tambralinga at least since 1156. The Sanskrit inscription of 1230, found at Wat Sema Mueang in Nakhon Si Thammarat, supplies the clan name directly. It gives the king's personal name as Chandrabhanu, calls him lord of Tambralingga and styles him Sri Dharmaraja. It describes him as versed in law after the manner of Dharmasoka, and identifies him both as of the Padmavamsa and as head of the Pancanavamsa.

The relationships between Tambralinga and the Tai leaders in the north of the Kra Isthmus was speculated to have begun during the reign of Chandrabhanu I, which was expected to be one of the reasons that Srivijaya lost influence over Tambralinga. During the reign of Chandrabhanu II, Ligor was known as Pataliputra as the area of the Kra Isthmus was called Vartma–setu (lit. 'causeway on the route') or Varttma dvayantara (lit. 'the region between two trade routes') and was controlled by Kalinga family.

In 1244, King Chandrabhanu invaded Sri Lanka, adopting the regnal name 'Srīdḥarmarāja' and installing himself as the king of Jaffna. This era ended with the losses of Tambralinga in the 1247–1270 Tambralinga–Sri Lanka Wars. Several local legends said the Padmavamsa clan ended due to the plague.

=== Decline: late 13th century ===
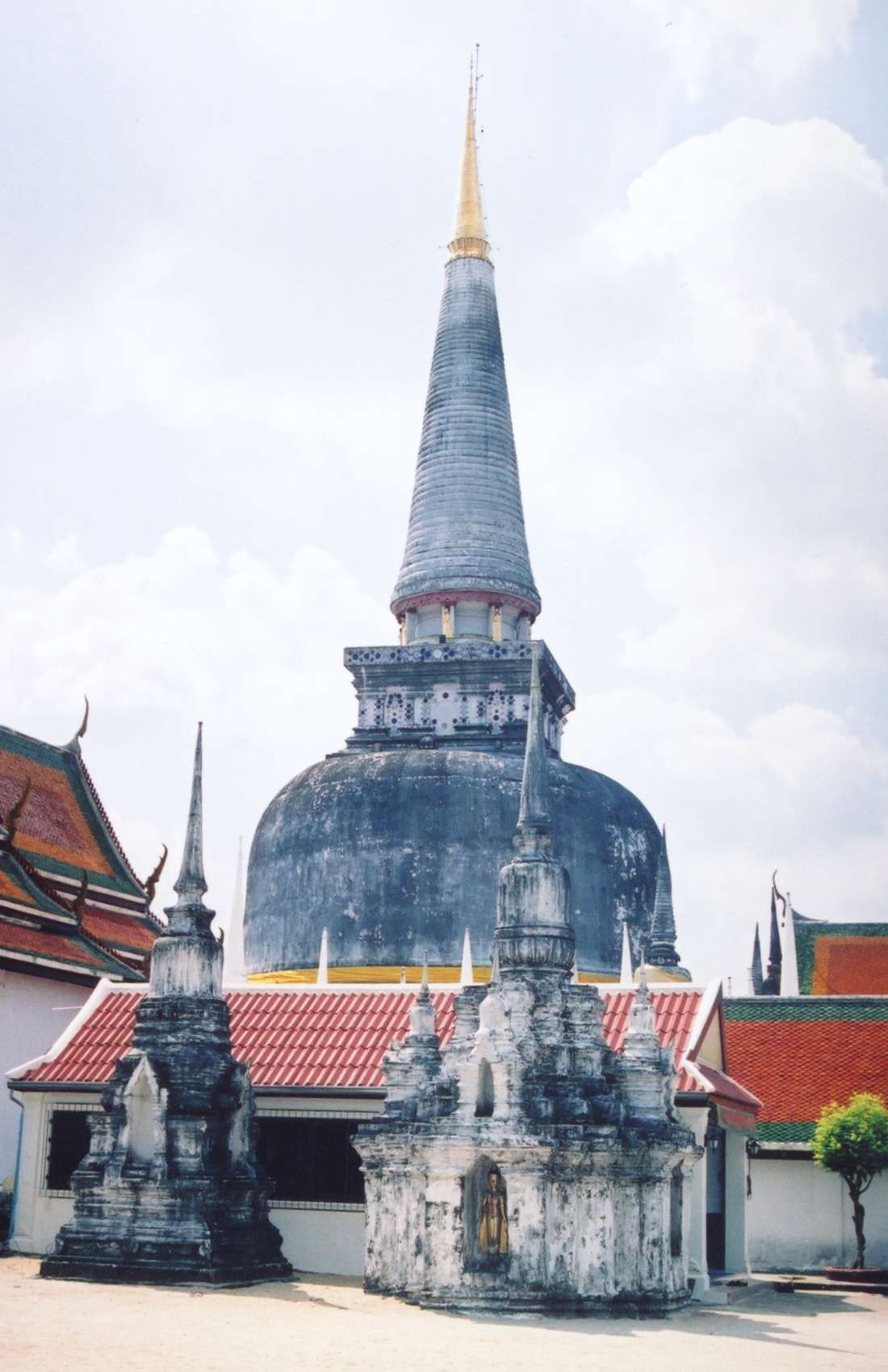
The Buddhist stupa Chedi Phrae Boromadhatu built by Chandrabhanu of the Padmavamsa lineage

After Chandrabhanu III (Sri Thammasokaraj IV) died in battle in Sri Lanka, his younger brother became the successor and was crowned Sri Dharmasokaraja V (ศรีธรรมาโศกราชที่ 5). During his reign, the kingdom faced several challenges, including the invasion of Singhasari's king Kertanagara from 1268–69 and the plague in 1270, which led to the decline of Tambralinga. Sri Dharmasokaraja V died with no heirs in 1272, marking the end of the Padmavamsa clan. In 1270, according to the Ram Khamhaeng Inscription, a number of savants from Tambralinga evacuated northward to the Sukhothai Kingdom.

After that, Phanomwang (พระพนมวัง), a prince from the Phetchaburi–Ayodhya clan, with his wife Sadieng Thong (สะเดียงทอง) and son Sri Racha (เจ้าศรีราชา), were assigned by Phetchaburi's king to rule Nakhon Si Thammarat. This led to the formation of the Sri Thammasokaraj clan and the expansion of Tai influence to the south of the Kra Isthmus. Even the enthronement was patrilineal succession but an appointment from Ayodhya was needed. According to the Ramkhamhaeng stele of 1283 (or 1292), Tambralinga which was recognized as Nakhon Si Thammarat became the southernmost tributary of Sukhothai. Chit Phumisak noted that the name Nakhon Si Thammarat itself is first attested in that inscription, earlier sources using Tambralinga throughout, and took it to be a Sukhothai coinage formed on the Sri Dharmaraja title borne by the Padmavamsa kings.

In 1365 Majapahit, the Kingdom of Java, recognized Nakorn Sri Dharmaraja as Dharmanagari written in the Nagarakretagama. Despite its rapid rise to prominence in the 13th century, that is, by the following century Danmaling, or Tambralinga, the former member state of Sanfoshih – Javaka, had become a part of Siam (Ayutthaya Kingdom).

== Warfare ==
=== Wars with Menam polities and Haripuñjaya ===
In the early 10th century, battles between the two Mon mandalas of Lavo and Haripuñjaya happened several times. According to the O Smach Inscription, two years into his reign King Rathasatkara or Trapaka (Thai: อัตราสตกะราช/ตราพกะ) of Haripuñjaya moved south to attack the Lavo Kingdom. The Lavo king, Uchitthaka Chakkawat or Ucchitta Emperor (อุฉิฎฐกะจักรวรรดิ/อุจฉิตตจักรพรรดิ), then moved northward to defend. However, the war between these two sister states spread to the southern kingdom of Siridhammana (Tambralinga), the king of Siridhammana, Jivaka or Suchitra (พระเจ้าชีวก/พระเจ้าสุชิตราช), took advantage of the situation to occupy Lavo. Due to losing Lavo, both Mon kings rallied up north to occupy Haripuñjaya, but King Rathasatkara eventually lost the city to Lavo's king. After failing to retake Haripuñjaya, King Rathasatkara moved south to settle in Phraek Si Racha (present-day in Sankhaburi district). This battle was also mentioned in the Jinakalamali and Cāmadevivaṃsa chronicles.

After Jivaka took Lavo's capital Lavapura (ลวปุระ), he appointed his son, Kampoch or Kambojaraja (กัมโพช), as the new ruler and enthroned the ex-Lavo queen as his consort. No records mention whether he then resided in Lavo or went back to rule Siridhammana. Three years later, King Kampoch attacked Haripuñjaya but lost. He then attempted to seize another northern city, Nakaburi (นาคบุรี), but also failed. Several battles between Haripuñjaya and Lavo happened since then. Kampoch was married to a Khmer princess who had fled an Angkorian dynastic bloodbath.

Later in 960, Lavapura was annexed by Siamese from Ayodhya, who also shared a political relation with Tambralinga kingdom.

=== 1002–1010 Tambralinga–Ankorian–Lavo Wars ===
Cœdès suggests that Sujita, who was the king of Tambralinga, won over Udayadityavarman I of Angkor in 1003 and enthroned as Jayavirahvarman. On the epigraphic dating, Udayādityavarman I died in 1001 and both Jayavīravarman and Suryavarman I were consecrated in 1002, the former ruling at Angkor and in the west and the latter in the east. K.834 from Tuol Don Srei records that the ensuing war lasted nine years, and six oath inscriptions taken in 1011 mark its close. This led to a nine-year Angkorian civil war in which Suryavarman I of Lavo won the battle and became the successor of Jayavirahvarman in 1010. However, Achille Dauphin-Meunier proposes that Jayavirahvarman was the rightful successor and brother of Udayadityavarman I. Suryavarman I was believed to be Kambojaraja, a son of Sujita and an Angkorian princess. He was appointed the new ruler of Lavo Kingdom after it was taken over by his father in the 925–927 Tambralinga–Lavo–Haripuñjaya wars. Some academics cite Suryavarman I was instead a Khmer opponent who evicted Jayavirahvarman out of Angkor.

However, the most recent studies found that Suryavarman I was actually from the easternmost regions with strongholds in Sambor and Kratié, but later had influence westward to Kampong Thom. Meanwhile, Jayavirahvarman controlled the western part but after losing the throne to Suryavarman I, he fled to Battambang and then to his power base in the Phimai region. This led to Suryavarman I's offensive campaign of the Khorat Plateau and Chao Phraya basin, which included the Lavo Kingdom. Suryavarman I's invading of Lavo is probably a cause of the 1025–1026 Tambralinga/Srivijiya–Ankorian/Chola Wars. Suryavarman I's own inscriptions, however, give him an Angkorian ancestry rather than a peninsular one. K.275 states that he was born into the family of Indravarman I, and K.380 and K.660 that his queen Vīralakṣmī belonged to the line of Harṣavarman I and Īśānavarman II. K.136 and K.161 concede, however, that he had no claim by descent from his immediate predecessors and obtained the kingdom by battle. Michael Vickery has accordingly described the proposal that Suryavarman I originated in a ruling family in what is now Thailand or on the Malay Peninsula as an ingenious speculation for which convincing proof is lacking.

=== 1025–1026 Tambralinga/Srivijiya–Angkorian/Chola Wars ===
Map of the Chola Empire after Rajendra I's Southeast Asian campaign.

Suryavarman I overthrew Jayavirahvarman from the Angkor throne in 1010. Three year later, he devastated Lavo which was ruled by Tambralinga's prince Kambojaraja. The campaign is recorded in the Khmer inscription K.1198, dated 1014, which describes Lavapura as reduced to jungle and its western districts as abandoned, and charges the general Lakṣmīpativarman with restoring and repopulating them. He then requested aid from Emperor Rajendra Chola I of the Chola dynasty against Tambralinga. After learning of Suryavarman's alliance with Rajendra Chola, Tambralinga requested aid from the Srivijaya king, Sangrama Vijayatunggavarman. This eventually led to the Chola Empire coming into conflict with Srivijaya. The conflict ended with a victory for the Chola and heavy losses for Tambralinga and Srivijaya with the capture of Sangrama Vijayatunggavarman in the Chola raid in 1025.

Following the Chola naval campaign against Srivijaya in 1025, the Cholas conducted further expeditions against ports in Sumatra and the Malay Peninsula. In some recensions of the Malay Annals, a figure known as Raja Chulan appears and is sometimes identified by modern scholars with Rajendra Chola I. However, the Malay Annals were compiled several centuries after the events they describe, and the Chola Empire did not establish direct rule over Southeast Asia though they might have levied a periodic tribute.

=== 1247–1270 Tambralinga–Dambadeniya Wars ===
According to the inscription No. 24 found at Hua-wieng temple in Chaiya near Nakhon Si Thammarat, the ruler of Tambralinga named Chandrabhanu Sridhamaraja was the king of Padmavamsa (Lotus dynasty). He began his reign in 1230, he had the Phra Borommathat (chedi in Nakhon Si Thammarat, from Sanskrit dhatu - element, component, or relic + garbha - storehouse or repository) reparation and celebration in the same year. Chandrabhanu Sridhamaraja brought Tambralinga to the pinnacle of its power in the mid-13th century. From the Sri Lankan and Tamil materials, records, and sources, Chandrabhanu was a Savakan king from Tambralinga who had invaded Sri Lanka in 1247. His navy launched an assault on the southern part of the island but was defeated by the Sri Lankan king.

However Chandrabhanu was able to establish an independent regime in the north of the island over the Jaffna kingdom, but in 1258 he was attacked and subjugated by the Tamil Emperor Jatavarman Sundara Pandyan. He was compelled to pay a tribute of precious jewels and elephants to the Pandya dynasty. In 1262 Chandrabhanu launched another attack on the south of the island, his army strengthened this time by the addition of Tamil and Sinhalese forces. He was defeated when Pandya sided with the Sri Lankan side, Jatavarman Sundara Pandyan's brother Jatavarman Veera Pandyan intervened, and Chandrabhanu himself was killed in the fighting. Chandrabhanu's son Savakanmaindan inherited the throne and submitted to Veera Pandyan's rule, received rewards and retained control over the northern kingdom. His regime too had disappeared following Maravarman Kulasekara Pandyan I's ascension to the Pandya empire's throne and another invasion of the island by the army of the Pandya dynasty in the late 1270s. Maravarman Kulasekara Pandyan I installed his minister in charge of the invasion, Kulasekara Cinkaiariyan, an Aryachakravarti as the new king of Jaffna. Vickery read Chandrabhanu's dealings with Ceylon, between about 1230 and 1270 and often bellicose, as possibly the very beginning of Sinhalese Buddhist influence at Nakhon Si Thammarat. On that reading it was not yet a place from which missionary monks set out, and he judged the details and most of the sources carrying them to be anything but satisfactory. He also reported that Coedès held Nakhon not to have been Thai at that date, and to have been conquered by the Thai only after Chandrabhanu's death.

In at least two senses, the rapid expansion of Tambralinga is exceptional in the history of Southeast Asia. In the first place, Candrabhanu's invasion of Sri Lanka and occupation of the Jaffna kingdom marks the only time that a Southeast Asian power has launched an overseas military expedition beyond the immediate Southeast Asian region. In the second place, in the historiography of Southeast Asia, southern Thailand has generally played a secondary role to that of places like Java, Sumatra, the Malacca Strait region (Srivijaya in the seventh~eighth century, Melaka in the 15th century), Cambodia, Champa, Vietnam, and Burma. Tambralinga's sudden appearance on centre-stage in the 13th century was thus highly unusual.

== List of rulers ==
=== Early mandalas era: 5th – 11th centuries CE ===
Information regarding Tambralinga's king during this era is scattered and largely based on local legends. Except for Sujita who was mentioned in some chronicles. This era ended with heavy losses for Tambralinga in the 1025–1026 Tambralinga/Srivijiya–Ankorian/Chola Wars.

Rulers		Reign	Note	Contemporary event
Romanized name	Thai name	Reign	Note	Contemporary event
Rulers before the reign of Sujita are still unknown.
Sujita/Vararāja/Sīvaka/To-hsi-chi	พระเยาวรราช/ชีวกราช/สุชิตราช/สุรชิตราช/	c. 927	Father of Kambojaraja, king of Lavo.	Fall of the Dvaravati civilization (11th century)
Narapativiravarman?		?–1001	Later won over Yaśodharapura.	Fall of the Dvaravati civilization (11th century)
Udayadityavarman I?		1001–1002	Younger brother of the previous.	Fall of the Dvaravati civilization (11th century)
Suryavarman I?		1002–1003?	Usurper. Younger brother of the previous. Later claimed Yaśodharapura in 1006.	Fall of the Dvaravati civilization (11th century)
Unknown		1003–1025	The dynasty ended after losing in the wars against the Chola Empire.	Fall of the Dvaravati civilization (11th century)
The Malay peninsula faced 20 years of being raided by the Chola Empire as the post-match of the 1025–1026 Tambralinga/Srivijiya–Ankorian/Chola Wars.				Fall of the Dvaravati civilization (11th century)

=== Padmavamsa clan: 12th – mid 13th centuries ===
Wannasarn Noonsuk notes that the title Si Thammasokarat, repeated in every version of the local chronicles, has not been found in any local inscription. The nearest attestation is the Dong Mae Nang Mueang inscription, dated 1167 or 1168 and found much farther north in Nakhon Sawan province. He suggests the ruler's title may instead have been Si Thammarat, the form Candrabhānu uses in his own inscription.

Rulers		Reign	Note	Siamese era
Romanized name	Thai name	Reign	Note	Siamese era
From 1060 or 1130 – 1176, Tambralinga was probably under the control of the Pagan Kingdom.
Sri Saiyanarong	ศรีไสยณรงค์		From Hanthawaddy.	
Dharmakasat	ธรรมกษัตริย์		Younger brother of the previous.; The dynasty ended due to the plague.	
Vacant		?–1077		
Sri Dharmasokaraja I (Norabadi)	ศรีธรรมโศกราชที่ 1/พญานรบดี	1077–1157	Fled from Lavo–Indapraṣṭhanagara	Sai Nam Peung of Ayodhya (r.1111–1165)
Sri Dharmasokaraja II	ศรีธรรมาโศกราชที่ 2/ จันทรภาณุที่ 1	1157–1183	Sent tribute to China in 1168.; Territory wars with Phichaithep Chiang Saen. (Father of Ayodhya's king Uthong II)	Dhammikaraja (r.1165–1205) of Ayodhya
Sri Dharmasokaraja III (Maharaja Sri Mattrailokyarajamaulibhusanavarmadeva?)	ศรีธรรมาโศกราชที่ 3/ จันทรภาณุที่ 2	1183–1230	Younger brother of the previous	Uthong II (r.1205–1253) of Ayodhya
Sri Thammasokaraj IV, known as Chandrabhanu (III) (formerly Pongse Suraha)	ศรีธรรมาโศกราชที่ 4/จันทรภาณุที่ 3/พงษาสุระที่ 1	1230 (Note: As Tambralinga king.) or 1244 (Note: As Jaffna king.)–1262	Son of Kalinga Magha of the Polonnaruwa Kingdom who was from the Malay Peninsula.; Territory expanded to Sri Lanka; Younger brother of the previous.	Jayasena (r.1253–1289) of Ayodhya
Sri Dharmasokaraja V	ศรีธรรมาโศกราชที่ 5	1263–1272 or 1277	The last ruler of the Padmavamsa clan of Tambralinga	Jayasena (r.1253–1289) of Ayodhya
End of Padmavamsa clan

=== Transitional era: late 13th century ===
Rulers		Reign	Note	Siamese era
Romanized name	Thai name	Reign	Note	Siamese era
Phanomwang	พนมวัง	1270s–?	Son of Phetchaburi's king Phanom Thale Sri (พนมทะเลศรี)	
Sri Thammasokaraj (formerly Sri Racha)	ศรีธรรมาโศกราช/ศรีราชา		Son of the previous.	
Oo	อู		Co-rulers; Oo was a grandson of the previous, while Yoo was the younger brother.	
Yoo	อยู่		Co-rulers; Oo was a grandson of the previous, while Yoo was the younger brother.	
Sri Chomrat/Ram	ศรีจอมรัตน์/ราม		Son of Oo, Last ruler from the Sri Thammasokaraj clan.	
Sri Maharaja (formerly Intara)	ศรีมหาราชา/อินทารา	1407–1418	From the local clan, Sri Maharaja, seat at Lan Saka. Became the ruler of Nakhon Si Thammarat after married Ueay, a daughter of Sri Chomrat.: Chit Phumisak read the office as a religious and land-administration post rather than the town governorship, an acting governor being appointed alongside it, and emended the chronicle's date of Maha Sakarat 1550 to 1407, the holder being recorded as dying in 1418.	
Sri Thanu/Sri Tun/Sri Maharaja II	ศรีทนู/ศรีทูน		Son of the previous.	
End of the Sri Maharaja clan, the next rulers were directly appointed by Ayodhya.

== Heritage and restoration ==
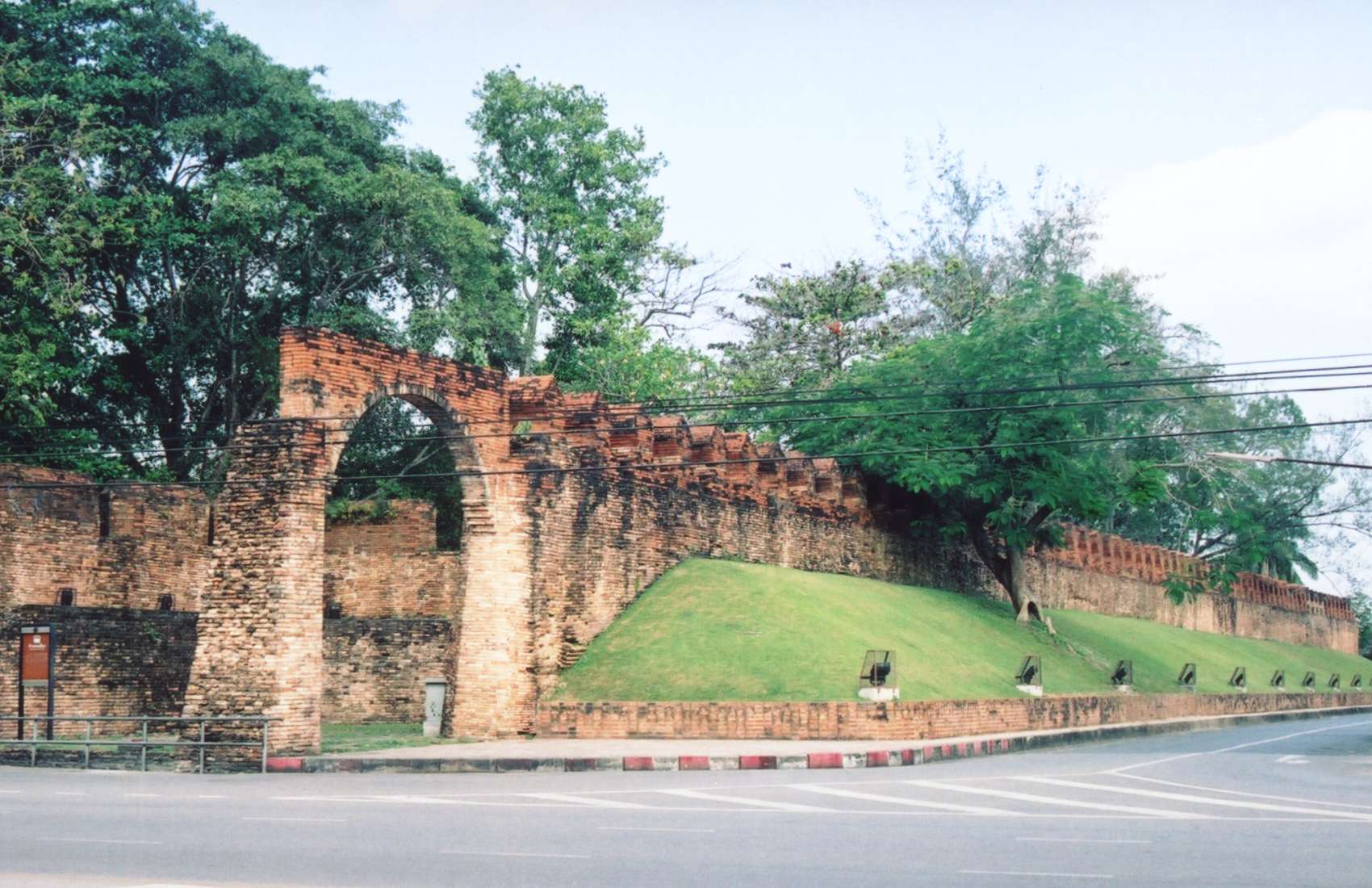
Northern gate of the old walled town. The only gate that still exists.

The city chronicle mentions a fortification when the town was refounded in 1278. The Ram Khamhaeng inscription of 1283 lists Nakhon Si Thammarat as one of the tributary kingdoms of Sukhothai. In the Old Javanese Desawarnana document of 1365, the Majapahit kingdom also recognised Nakhon Si Thammarat as belonging to Siam. In the Palatinate Law of King Trailok dated 1468, Nakhon Si Thammarat was listed as one of eight great cities (Phraya maha nakhon) belonging to the Ayutthaya Kingdom. During the reign of King Naresuan (r. 1590–1605) it became a first class province (Mueang Ek).

Restorations were recorded at the time of King Ramesuan (1388–1395), as well as King Narai (1656–1688) of Ayutthaya. The latter one was supported by the French engineer M. de la Mare.

The walls of the town spread 456 meters from east to west, and 2,238 meters north to south, thus enclosing an area of about one square kilometre. The northern wall had only one gate, called Pratu Chai Nuea or Pratu Chai Sak, while the southern wall also had only one gate. To the east there were three gates, which connected the town with the sea. To the west were five gates. Today only the northern gate still exists, together with a short stretch of the northern city wall.

== See also ==
- Category:Monarchs of Tambralinga
- Naksat cities
- Greater India
- History of Indian influence on Southeast Asia
