= Masilamaninathar Temple, Tharangambadi =

Temple in Tamil Nadu, India

Masilamaninathar Temple, Tharangambadi, also known as Alappur is a Siva temple in Tharangambadi in Mayiladuthurai district in Tamil Nadu (India). It is situated at a distance of 8 km from Tirukkadayur.

The temple is situated 300m north to the famous Danish fort Dansborg. This is one of the few shore temples in India.

== Vaippu Sthalam ==
It is one of the shrines of the Vaippu Sthalams sung by Tamil Saivite Nayanars Appar and Sundarar.

== Presiding deity ==
The presiding deity is known as Masilamaninathar, Masilamanisvarar and Masilanathar. His consort is known as Akilandesvari.

=== The earlier temple ===
The earlier temple was very near to the sea. The waves of the sea touch the temple. In the kosta of the old temples Dakshinamurthi and Lingotpavar are found. There is also a shrine for Vinayaka. In front of the sanctum sanctorum, which is closed, nandhi and bali peeta are found.

=== The present temple ===
Just in front of the old temple, the present temple, is found now. The Kumbhabhishekham of this temple was held on 1 September 2013. In the sanctum sanctorum the presiding deity is found. In front of the presiding deity Nandhi and balipeeta are found. At the left side of the shrine, the shrine of the goddess is found. In the kosta Dakshinamurthy, Lingotpava and Brahma are found. In the prakara shrines of Vinayaka, Subramania with his consorts Valli and Deivanai, Balamuruga, Akilandesvari and Gajalakshmi are found, followed by Chandikeswara and Navagraha shrine. Next to them Chandra, Surya and Bairava are found.

=== Inscriptions ===
In inscriptions the names of Kulasekarapatnam and Sadakanbadi are found.

== History ==
Masilamaninathar Temple is a more than 700-year-old monument. This temple was built by the Pandiya King Maravarman Kulasekara Pandiyan I in the year 1306. The temple's architecture is a conglomeration of Tamil and Chinese Architecture, in an attempt to attract Chinese merchants and visitors who were visiting India in those days.

== Old Temple ==
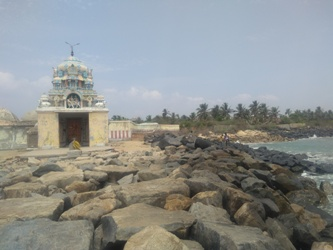
View from the sea

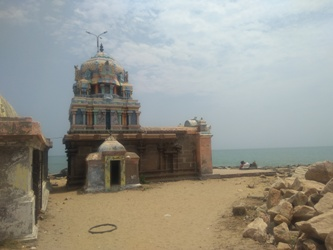
Nandhi in front of temple

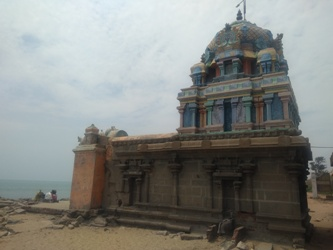
Vimana

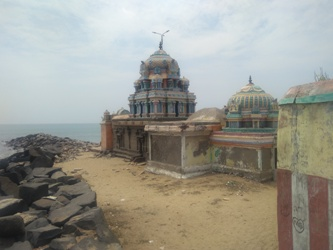
Other shrines

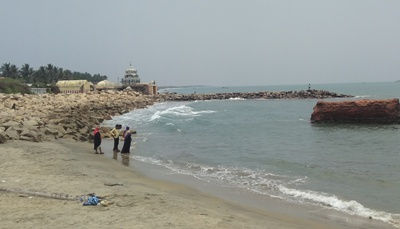
View from the sea

== New Temple ==
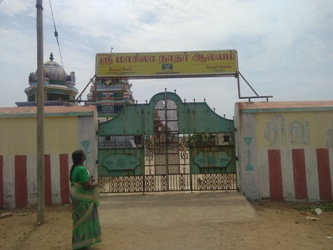
Entrance

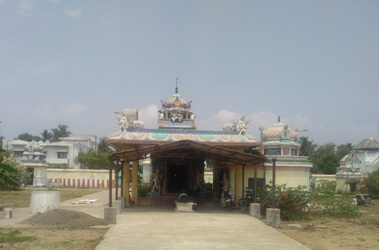
Front mandapa

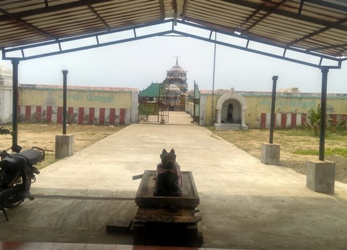
Nandhi in front of presiding deity

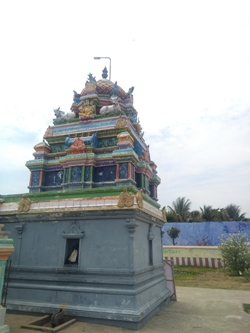
Vimana of the presiding deity

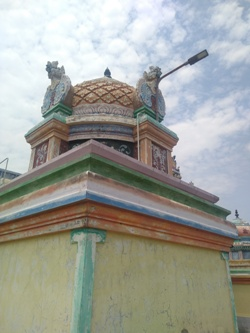
Vimana of the goddess
