= Maravarman Vikkiraman II =

Maravarman Vikkiraman II (Tamil: இரண்டாம் மாறவர்மன் விக்கிரம பாண்டியன்) was a Pandyan king, who ruled regions of South India between 1250–1251 CE.

== Shared rule ==
Maravarman Vikkiraman II was one of many Pandyan princes who ruled the Pandyan kingdom in the mid-13th Century. The practice of shared rule with one prince asserting primacy was common in the Pandyan Kingdom. The other princes of the Pandyan royal family with whom he shared his rule were Jatavarman Sundara Pandyan I and Jatavarman Veera Pandyan I

== End of Hoysala Hegemony ==
His rule marked the end of more than two decades of Hoysala influence over the Pandya kingdom. His meikeerthi declares that he was like a lion to the Hoysala elephant (Tamil: போசள யானைக்கு சிம்மம் போன்றவன்).

== Notes ==
Preceded by Maravarman Sundara Pandyan II	Pandya; 1250–1251	Succeeded by Jatavarman Sundara Pandyan I
