= Sri Dharmasokaraja III =

King of Tambralinga from 1183 to 1230

Sri Dharmasokaraja III ศรีธรรมโศกราชที่ 3

King of Tambralinga
- Reign: 1183–1230
- Predecessor: Sri Dharmasokaraja II
- Successor: Chandrabhanu III
- Born: Indaprasthanagara
- Died: 1230; Nakhon Si Thammarat
- Dynasty: Padmavamsa (Lotus)

Sri Dharmasokaraja III (Thai: ศรีธรรมโศกราชที่ 3), also known as Chandrabhanu II (จันทรภาณุที่ 2) or Vaṃśasurā I (พงษ์สุราหะที่ 1) , was a late 12th–early 13th century monarch of Tambralinga, mentioned in the Legend of Nakhon Si Thammarat. He is said to have succeeded his elder brother, Sri Dharmasokaraja II, in 1183 CE.

Thai scholarship has often equated him with Chandrabhanu (III), the ruler renowned for the expansion of Tambralinga’s authority into Lanka; however, Chandrabhanu (III) is generally dated to a reign spanning 1230–1262 CE and is therefore understood to have succeeded Sri Dharmasokaraja III. The precise dynastic relationship between Sri Dharmasokaraja III and Chandrabhanu (III) consequently remains a matter of ongoing scholarly debate, since Chandrabhanu (III) is identified as a son of Kalinga Magha of the Polonnaruwa Kingdom, while at the same time being claimed in some traditions to belong to the same dynastic line as the earlier Sri Dharmasokaraja rulers.
