= Nakhon Si Thammarat Kingdom =

Former kingdom in South Thailand

Nakhon Si Thammarat Kingdom อาณาจักรนครศรีธรรมราช Anachak Nakhon Si Thammarat
- 13th century–1782
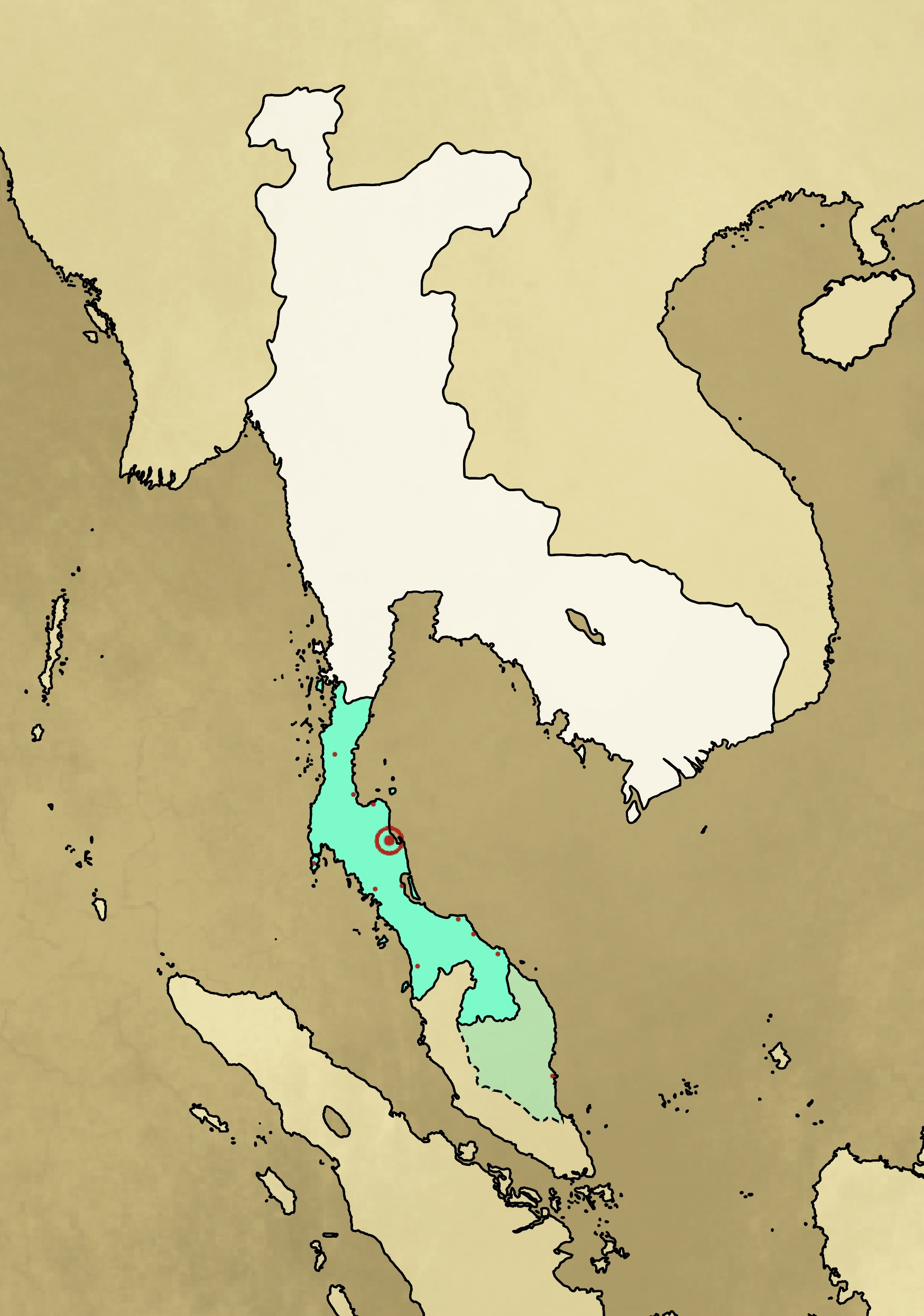
- Nakhon Si Thammarat (blue) as a vassal state of Ayutthaya in 1603
- Status: Vassal State of the Sukhothai Kingdom (c. 1283–1298), Ayutthaya Kingdom (16th century–1767), Thonburi Kingdom (1769–1782), and Rattanakosin Kingdom (1782)
- Capital: Nakhon Si Thammarat (Ligor)
- Common languages: Sukhothai – official 1283-late 17th century.; Early Modern Southern Thai – official during late 17th century.; Khmer – lingua franca; Sanskrit and Pali – for religious and ceremonial use; Malay – spoken among ethnic Malays; Various Chinese dialects –spoken among ethnic Chinese
- Religion: Theravada Buddhism (dominant), Islam, Hinduism
- Government: Monarchy
- King
  - 1283: Sri Thammasokaraj
- Historical era: Middle Ages, Early modern period
  - Establishment of a Tai kingdom: 13th century
  - Vassal of Sukhothai: c. 1279–1298
  - Vassal of Ayutthaya: 16th century
  - Second fall of Ayutthaya: 1767
  - Vassal of Thonburi: 1769
  - Demoted to Rattanakosin province: 1782
Preceded by	Succeeded by
Tambralinga	Rattanakosin Kingdom
- Today part of: Thailand

The Nakhon Si Thammarat Kingdom (Thai: อาณาจักรนครศรีธรรมราช RTGS: Anachak Nakhon Si Thammarat), Nagara Sri Dharmaraja or the Kingdom of Ligor, was one of the major constituent city states (mueang) of the Siamese kingdoms of Sukhothai and later Ayutthaya and controlled a sizeable part of the Malay Peninsula. Its capital was the eponymous city of Nakhon Si Thammarat in what is now Southern Thailand.

== History ==
=== Sukhothai period ===
Most historians identify the Tambralinga kingdom (existing c. 10th to 13th century) as a precursor of Nakhon Si Thammarat. During the late 1st and early 2nd millennium CE, Tai peoples expanded in mainland Southeast Asia. By the 13th century, they made Nakhon Si Thammarat one of their mueang (city-states). The exact circumstances of the Tai taking over the earlier Buddhist and Indianised kingdom at this location remain unclear, but it must have taken place before the mid-13th century.

The Ramkhamhaeng stele of 1283 (or 1292) lists Nakhon Si Thammarat as the southernmost tributary kingdom of Sukhothai, probably ruled by Sri Thammasokaraj, a relative of King Ram Khamhaeng. Nakhon Si Thammarat's Buddhist Theravada tradition was a model for the whole Sukhothai kingdom. Exemplary for the Southeast Asian Mandala model, the dependency towards Sukhothai was only personal, not institutional. Therefore, after Ram Khaemhaeng's death, Nakhon Si Thammarat regained its independence and became the dominant Thai mueang on the Malay Peninsula.

=== Ayutthaya period ===
In the Old Javanese Desawarnana document of 1365, the Majapahit kingdom recognised Nakhon Si Thammarat as belonging to Siam. The Palatine law of King Trailok dated 1468, listed Nakhon Si Thammarat as one of eight "great cities" (phraya maha nakhon) belonging to the Ayutthaya kingdom. Nevertheless, it maintained its own dynasty and had vassal states of its own, which it mediated to Ayutthaya (again a typical feature of the Mandala model with its tiered levels of power). Under king Naresuan (r. 1590–1605) it became instead a "first class province" (mueang ek). However, the post of provincial governor was still quasi-hereditary and usually handed down from father to son within the old Nakhon Si Thammarat dynasty. It was the most important among Ayutthaya's southern provinces and enjoyed a primacy vis-à-vis the other provinces on the Malay Peninsula. Its role in overseas trade (involving Dutch and Portuguese merchants) resulted in the province's substantial wealth and contributed to a high level of confidence and claim of autonomy.

During the Ayutthayan succession conflict of 1629, Nakhon Si Thammarat rebelled against the new king Prasat Thong. The usurper sent the influential Japanese adventurer Yamada Nagamasa with his mercenary force to quell the rebellion and made him governor and lord of Nakhon Si Thammarat for a short time. Another insurrection of Nakhon Si Thammarat against the capital took place after the Siamese revolution of 1688 when the local ruler refused to accept the accession of usurper king Phetracha.

=== Thonburi period ===
After the fall of Ayutthaya in 1767, Nakhon Si Thammarat again enjoyed a short period of independence, including its subordinate provinces on the Malay Peninsula, but was subdued by Taksin in 1769 on his mission to reunite Siam.

=== Rattanakosin period ===
Under Rama I, the rank of the Lord of Nakhon Si Thammarat was demoted from a vassal ruler to a mere governor of a first-class province and his control over the northern Malay sultanates (including Patani) was taken away, instead awarding them to the governor of Songkhla. Nakhon Si Thammarat was supervised by the Kalahom (Minister of the Southern provinces). In 1821 and 1831 however, kings Rama II and Rama III again tasked the governor of Nakhon Si Thammarat to quell rebellions in the Malay sultanate of Kedah. The tiered relationships between Bangkok, Nakhon Si Thammarat and the Malay sultanates of Kedah and Perak posed a conundrum for the British East India Company in Malaya, which incorrectly assumed the European model of exclusive sovereignty (or suzerainty) over territories.

=== Integration into the Siamese central state ===
With the Thesaphiban reform of Prince Damrong Rajanubhab at the end of the 19th century the kingdom was finally fully absorbed into Siam. A new administrative entity named monthon (circle) was created, each supervising several provinces. Monthon Nakhon Si Thammarat, established in 1896, covered those areas on the east coast of the peninsula, i.e. the provinces Songkhla, Nakhon Si Thammarat and Phatthalung.

== Naksat cities ==
The modern seal of Nakhon Si Thammarat Province refers to the circle of twelve Naksat cities

According to the 16th-century Southern Thai Chronicles of Nakhon Si Thammarat and the Chronicles of Phra That Nakhon, Nakhon Si Thammarat was surrounded by a chain of 12 inter-linked cities, or Mueang, on the Malay Peninsula, called the Naksat cities (Thai: เมือง ๑๒ นักษัตร RTGS: Mueang Sip-Song Naksat). According to these accounts, the cities acted as an outer shield, surrounding the capital Nakhon Si Thammarat (Ligor), and were connected by land so that help could be sent from one city to another in the event of surprise attacks.

The Thai term naksat (from Sanskrit nakshatra) refers to the lunar calendar system with a duodenary cycle of years (Pi Naksat), based on the Chinese zodiac, with each year being associated with a particular animal.

M.C. Chand Chirayu Rajani identified 11 of the 12 cities and their associated zodiac emblems with the following locations on the Malay Peninsula: Narathiwat (Rat), Pattani (Ox), Kelantan (Tiger), Kedah (Dragon), Phattalung (Snake), Trang (Horse), Chumphon (Goat), Krabi (Monkey), Tha Chana (Rooster), Phuket (Dog), Kraburi (Pig). The exact location of Mueang Pahang, identified with the Rabbit, is unknown.

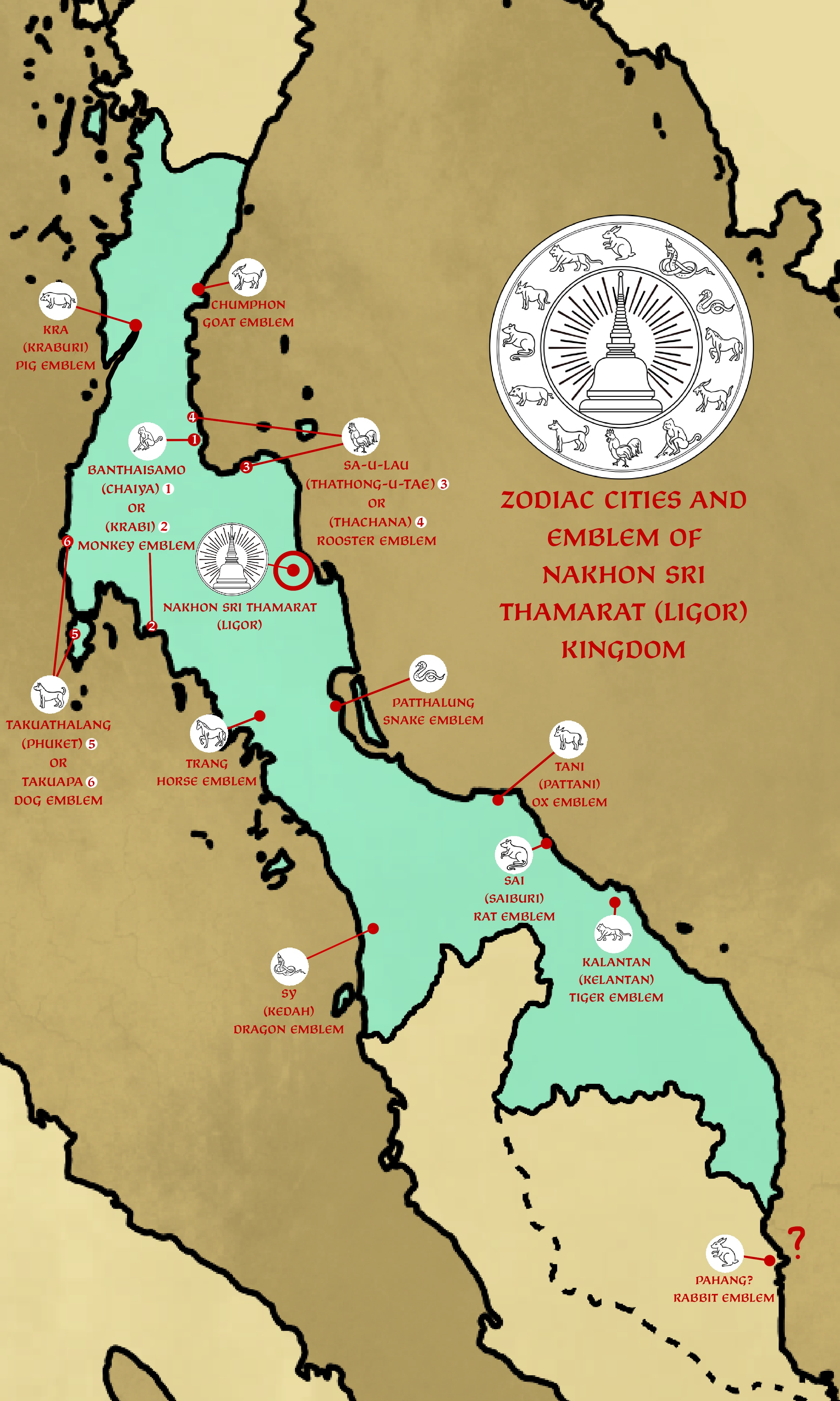
Proposed location of the 12 zodiac cities

However, there is no historic evidence that Nakhon Si Thammarat actually controlled these cities. Other reports from that period rarely describe Ligor as having any special role on the Malay Peninsula. The account in the chronicles seems to reflect the Siamese (Thai) claims to suzerainty over the Malay regions of the south during the mid-Ayutthaya period.

== List of rulers ==
The following table is a list of rulers of Nakhon Si Thammarat. The english terms "governor" and "province" are translations used by Stuart Munro-Hay in his book. However, there is strong evidence that both the rulers themselves and European powers regarded these rulers as kings in their own right. The Siamese term for Nakhon Si Thammarat changes over time. In the Palatine Law of 1458, it is a prathetsarat (often translated as tributary state) and the ruler entitled a chao phraya (one of the highest non-royal titles).

During the reign of Naresuan, the title prathetsarat was abandoned and Nakhon became a first-class "city". Again, the translation "city" is misleading and comes from the Thai mueang, which is also used for the capital of Siam, Ayutthaya. Official titles for cities and rulers in pre-modern Siam is complex. We know Nakhon was closely allied with Siam and that Ayutthaya became involved in succession politics, sometimes appointing outsiders to the position. However, most of the rulers were chosen from among the ruling elite of Nakhon.

Name of ruler	Years of rule	Title	Name of dynasty		Siamese historical period
Luang Sri Worawong	1375–?	governor			
Luang Pirentrathep	?–?	governor		There is no record of a ruler in between Sri Worawong and Pirentrathep, but Munro-Hay cannot confirm with certainty that one succeeded the other, p.110	
Maharacha dynasty
*This is not an official dynastic title, but the historic records show a clear patrilineal succession.
Maharachadanai	?–1452		Maharacha	Uncle of Borommatrailokkanat	
Sri Maharacha I			Maharacha	founds Lantaka–unclear if he is King of Nakhon Si Thammarat or not	
Sri Maharacha II (Phra La?)			Maharacha	son of Sri Maharacha I	
Khun Indra I			Maharacha	son of Sri Maharacha II	
Sri Danu (Khun Indra II, Sri Maharacha III)	1493–?		Maharacha	son Khun Indra I	
First era of Siamese-appointed rulers
Khun Ratanakan		governor	?		
Sri Maharacha IV				Munro-Hay says he was appointed by Ayutthaya and not recorded in the chronicles as a relative of the previous ruling family (p.110).	
Phraya Pontheparat	1495–?	Chao Phraya Nakhon Sri Thammarat		Munro-Hays says he was appointed by Ayutthaya (p.110)	
Sri Thammarachadet dynasty
*This is not an official dynastic title. The chronicles only clearly show that this period began with Sri Thammarachadet and ended with his grandson (or nephew) Sri Thammarat
Phraya Sri Thammarachadet	1497–?	governor	Sri Thammarachadet		
Phraya Ramrachatayanam	1500–?	governor	possible alternative dynasty: Ramrachatayanam	Munro-Hay simply lists him as appointed by Ayutthaya. Does not mention if he is related to Sri Thammarachadet.	
Ramrachatayanam	1532–?	governor	possible alternative dynasty: Ramrachatayanam	Munro-Hay simply lists him as appointed by Ayutthaya. Does not mention if he is related to the first Ramrachatayanam (he states: "nothing is recorded of his time as governor").	Borommarachathirat IV (1529–1533)
Phraya Sri Thammarat	1535–?	governor	Sri Thammarachadet	grandson or nephew of Phraya Sri Thammarachadet	Chairacha (r.1533–1546)
Second Era of Siamese-Appointed Rulers
*We have scant information on this time period, especially the end of the 16th century and the mid-to-end of the 17th century.
Phraya Ponlarat	1553–?	Chao Phraya Nakhon Sri Thammarat		former governor of Tenasserim	Chakkraphat (r.1548–1569)
Intharathep		governor			Chakkraphat (r.1548–1569)
	1612			his son was the governor of Phattalung	
				Abolished phraya maha nakhon. Nakhon Si Thammarat is a first class province.	Naresuan
???	?–?			Only seem to have mention of this rulers brother, Okphra Amorarit	
Yamada Nagamasa	1629–1630	governor		Japanese governor appointed by Ayutthaya (Siamese title: Okya Seniphimok)	Prasat Thong
Okkhun Senaphimuk	1630–?			Son of Yamada, Married the daughter of the unknown ex-ruler's brother (Okphra Amorarit)	
?	?			Sent from Ayutthaya, fell ill on the way. Does not mean not part of the local ruling elite, who often went to reside in Ayutthaya, perhaps as a means for Siam to control the succession.	
	1631			van Vliet writes that King Prasat Thong of Ayutthaya attacked Nakhon himself, though the details of this story seem to be mixed up with an expedition to Chiangmai (Munro-Hay, p.237).	
?					
	1645			New governor arrives from Ayutthaya (Munro-Hay, p.138, citing the Batavia Dagh-Register).	
	1649			Ligor is occupied by Songkhla, which is united with Pattani and Phattalung (Munro-Hay, p.139)	
					Fa Chai
					Si Suthammaracha
?				Governor executed by Narai for murdering his former court poet (whom Narai had exiled to NST), Munro-Hay, p.156.	Narai
				NST demoted to 2nd rank city	Narai
Phraya Ram Dejo	1689–1692	governor (pu rang muang)		acting governor? Of Malay descent. Nakhon Si Thammarat is reduced in rank. Nakhon did not accept the usurping of the throne by Phethracha and rebelled.	Phetracha
					Suriyenthrathibodi
					Phumintharacha (Thai Sa)
Phraya Chaiathibet	1742–?	Chao Phraya Nakhon Sri Thammarat			Borommakot
Phraya Sukhotai	?–1758	Chao Phraya Nakhon			Borommakot
Phraya Rachasutawadi	1758–1760	Chao Muang Nakhon Sri Thammarat			Uthumphon (r.1758–1758) / Ekkathat (last king of Ayutthaya) / Alaungphaya of Burma (1760–1767) took Ligor
Palat Nu dynasty
*This is not an official dynastic title. The historic record clearly shows that Nu, Noi, Noi Klang, and Nu Prom was a patrilineal succession
Nu	1760–1767	Chao Nakhon	Palat Nu	Nu was deputy governor to Phraya Rachasutawadi and was known as Luang Sit Rai Wen Mahatlek or Phra Palat Nu. Munro-Hay says that although we have no information on Nu's origins, certain references in the Chronicles and the former titles he held suggest he was likely a member of the Nakhon ruling family. He immediately commanded loyalty from Chumpon in the North to Kelantan and Trengganu in the South.	Ekkathat (last king of Ayutthaya)
Nu	1767–1769	Proclaimed himself King of all of Siam	Palat Nu	subdued by Taksin	
Chao Narasuriwong	1770–1777	Chao muang pratetsarat		Nephew of King Taksin, appointed while Nu sent to Thonburi. NST raised to status of tributary again.	
Nu	1777–1784	Phra chao Nakhon Sri Thammarat / Chao Phraya Nakhon	Palat Nu	Nu also ruler of a vassal state (prathetsarat) and has power to appoint own ministers in same manner as court of Thonburi (Source: Chronicle of the First Reign by Chao Phraya Thiphakorawong). Nu's title was downgraded to Chao Phraya.	Taksin/Rama I
Phat	1784–1811	governor	Palat Nu	former uparat, son-in-law of Nu (Munro-Hay, p.169). NST downgraded to a first class province	Rama I/Rama II
Phra Aphirakphubet (Noi)	1811–1839	Chao Phraya Nakhon Sri Thammarat	Palat Nu	son of Nu (by Lady Prang), formerly assistant governor of Nakhon	Rama II / Rama III
Phra Sanehamontri (Noi Klang)	1839–1867	Phraya Nakhon Sri Thammarat	Palat Nu	son of Noi	Rama III / Mongkut (Rama IV)
Chao Phraya Suthammontri (Nu Prom)	1867–1901	1867-1894, Chao Phraya Nakhon Sri Thammarat 1894-1901, Pu wah ratchakarn (governor)	Palat Nu	son of Noi Klang	Mongkut/Chulalongkorn

== See also ==
- Greater India
- History of Indian influence on Southeast Asia
