= Savakanmaindan =

King of Tambralinga
- Reign: 1262–1277
- Coronation: 1262
- Predecessor: Chandrabhanu
- Successor: Sri Thammasokaraj (as King of Nakhon Si Thammarat)

King of Jaffna
- Reign: 1262–1277
- Predecessor: Chandrabhanu
- Successor: Kulasekara Cinkaiariyan
- Born: Tambralinga
- Died: 1277
- House: Padmavamsa (Lotus) dynasty
- Father: Chandrabhanu
- Religion: Buddhism

Savakanmaindan (or Savakan Maindan, Saavanmaindan and Javakanmaindan; reigned from 1262 - 1277) was a monarch of the kingdoms of Tambralinga and Jaffna. He was the son of the Savakan king Chandrabhanu of Tambralinga of the Padmavamsa (lotus dynasty), Captured northern Sri Lankan in 1255 AD. During his rule of Jaffna, the Venetian traveller Marco Polo visited northeastern Sri Lanka.

== Rule ==
Chandrabhanu moved north after his failure at invading southern kingdoms of Ceylon and secured the Jaffna throne for himself around 1255. During this time, his son Savakanmaindan administered the Tambralinga region. Jatavarman Sundara Pandyan of the Pandyan Empire in Tamilakam intervened in 1258 and made Chandrabhanu submit to Pandyan rule, annually offering precious jewels and elephants in tribute. A second attempt by Chandrabhanu to invade from the north prompted the Prince Jatavarman Veera Pandyan I, brother of emperor Jatavarman Sundara Pandyan I to intervene in 1262–1264. Chandrabhanu was killed in the battle. Veera Pandyan proceeded to plant the Pandyan bull victory flag at Koneswaram temple, Konamalai. The Kudumiyamalai Prasasti of the eleventh year of Veera Pandyan I reign relates the riches this conquest brought the Pandyans. Savakanmaindan, who had resisted Jatavarman Veera Pandyan I's forces in Jaffna Patnam, inherited the Jaffna throne upon his father's death.

Savakanmaindan professed initial contumacy to Pandyan rule but eventually submitted. He was rewarded and allowed to retain control of the Jaffna kingdom while Sundara Pandyan remained supreme Lord emperor of Pandyan. Marco Polo, describing Sundara Pandyan's empire as the richest in the world, visited the Jaffna kingdom upon docking at Trincomalee, and described the locals under king Sendemain's rule as mostly naked and feeding on rice and meat. The land was abundant with rubies and other precious stones, although at this stage Savakanmaindan was not paying tributes to the Pandyans. When Savakamaindan embarked on another invasion of the south, the Pandyas under King Maravarman Kulasekara Pandyan I again invaded and defeated his forces in the late 1270s. However, to further the power of Tamil hard power in the region, they eventually installed one of their ministers in charge of the invasion, Kulasekara Cinkaiariyan, an Aryacakravarti as the King. In the local Tamil language, all South East Asians are known as Javar or Javanese. There are number of place names in the Jaffna peninsula which pertains to its South East Asian connections. Chavakacheri means a Javanese settlement. Chavahakottai means a Javanese fort all alluding to Chandrabhanu's brief rule in the north.

Savakanmaindan House of Padmavamsa Born: ? Died: 1277
Regnal titles
Preceded by Chandrabhanu	King of Tambralinga; 1262–1277	Succeeded by Sri Thammasokaraj
Preceded by Chandrabhanu	King of Jaffna; 1262–1277	Succeeded by Kulasekara Cinkaiariyan
