= Jatavarman Sundara Pandyan I =

Pandyan King from 1251 to 1268

- Emmandalamum Kondaruliya Pandya, Tribhuvana Chakravarthy, Ponveintha Perumal, Hemachadana Raja
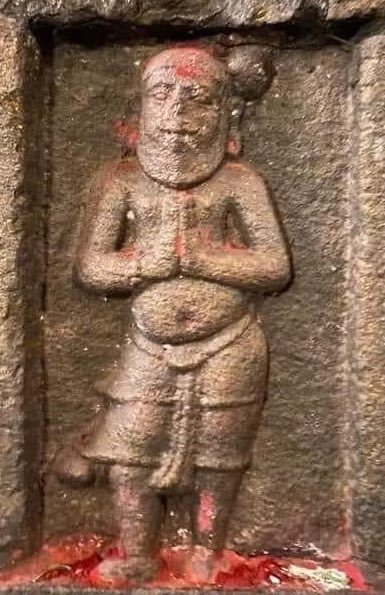
- Statue of Jatavarman Sundara Pandyan I

Pandyan Emperor
- Reign: April 1251 – June 1268
- Anointment: April 1251, (Note: He was crowned between 20 and 28 April 1251.) Chidambaram
- Predecessor: Maravarman Sundara Pandyan II
- Successor: Maravarman Kulasekara Pandyan I
- Born: Madurai, Pandya Empire (modern day Tamil Nadu, India)
- Died: June 1268; Madurai, Pandya Empire (modern day Tamil Nadu, India)
- Issue: Maravarman Kulasekara Pandyan I; Maravarman Vikrama Pandiyan II; Maravarman srivallaban
- Dynasty: Pandyan
- Father: Maravarman Sundara Pandyan II
- Religion: Hinduism

Jatavarman Sundara I, also known as Sadayavarma Sundara Pandyan, was a king of the Pandyan dynasty who ruled regions of Tamilakam (present day South India), Northern Sri Lanka, and Southern Andhra between 1250–1268 CE. He is remembered for his patronage of the arts and Dravidian architecture, along with refurbishment and decoration of many Kovils (temples) in the Tamil continent. He oversaw a massive economic growth of the Pandyan kingdom. On the eve of his death in 1268 CE, the imperial Pandyan kingdom's territorial extent had risen to its zenith till Nellore and Kadapa by defeating Telugu Chola rulers Vijaya Gandagopala, Manumasiddhi III of Nellore Cholas and Ganapatideva of Kakatiyas.

== Accession ==
Sundara Pandyan I acceded to the Pandyan throne in the year 1251 CE. During the middle part of the 13th century, Pandya kingdom was ruled by many princes of the royal line. This practice of shared rule with one prince asserting primacy was common in the Pandyan Kingdom. The other princes of the Pandyan royal family with whom Sundara Pandyan I shared his rule were Maravarman Vikkiraman II and his brother Jatavarman Veera Pandyan I.

== Historical background ==
By the middle of the 13th century, the Chola dynasty which had dominated Southern India over the past two centuries was declining. The last king of the Later Cholas, Rajendra Chola III reigned over a crumbling empire beset with rebellion and increasing external influence from Hoysalas and Kadavas. Previous rulers of the Pandyan kingdom like Maravarman Sundara Pandyan I had succeeded in overthrowing Chola hegemony. The Hoysala dominance over the Tamil Kingdoms had also waned by the time Sundara Pandyan I took the throne in 1251.

== Military conquests ==
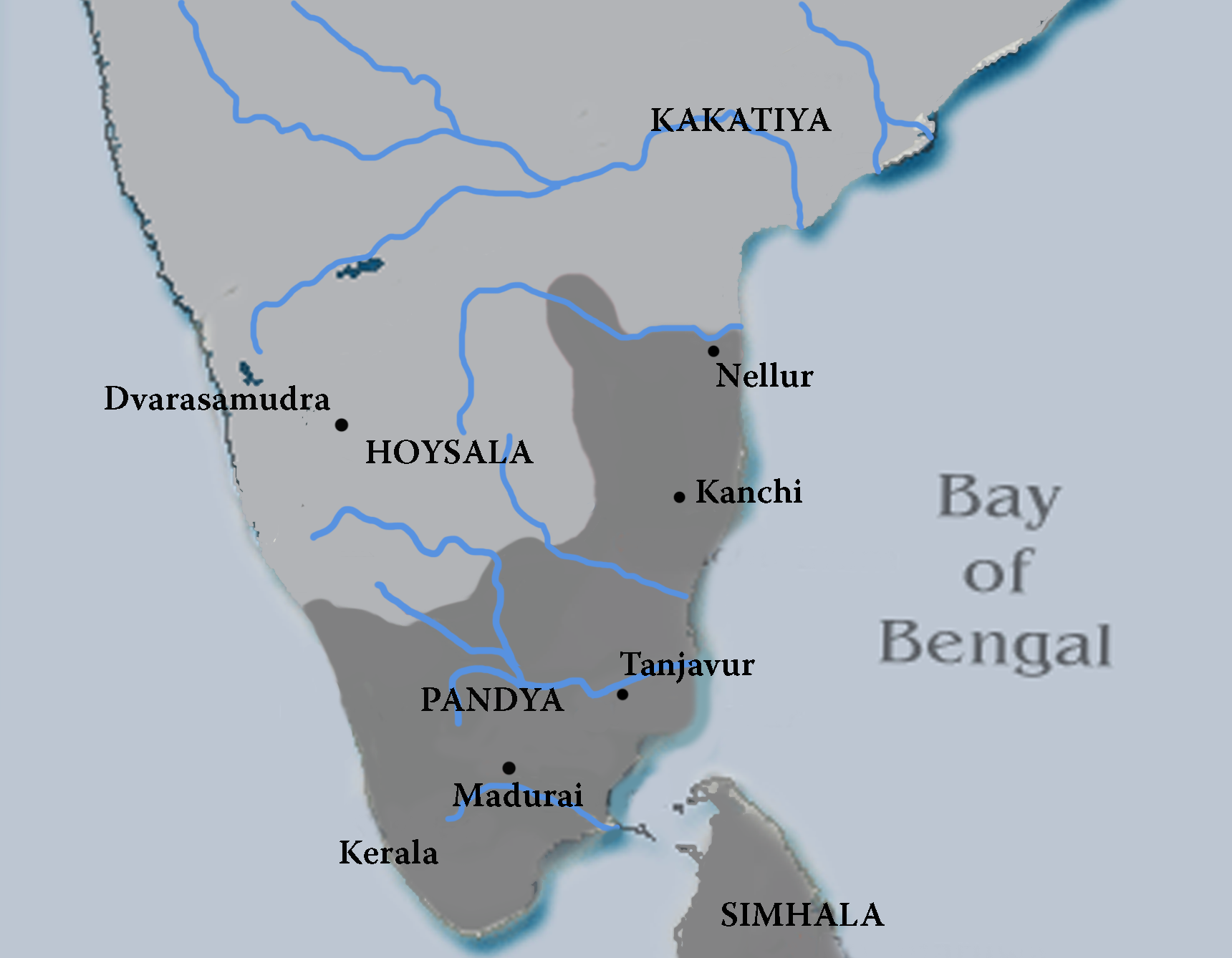
Pandyan Empire under Jatavarman Sundara Pandya I

The Koyilolugu, a record of gifts made to the Ranganatha temple at Srirangam, gives us a glimpse into the extensive military expeditions and the wealth of the treasury of Jatavarman Sundara Pandya. Here he styles himself :

"The uprooter of the Kerala race, a second Rama in plundering the island of Sri Lanka, the thuderbolt to a mountain the Chola race, the dispeller of the Karnata King, The fever to the elephant Kathaka king (the Gajapati king of Cuttack in Orissa), the junglefire to the forest Vijaya Ganda Gopalan, a lion to the deer Ganapati-deva (the Kakatiya king)"

=== Wars against Cheras and Cholas ===
Sundara Pandyan I launched his initial campaign against the Chera, then under the rule of Viraravi Udaya Marthandavarman. The Pandyan forces decisively defeated the Chera army, culminating in the death of the Chera monarch on the battlefield. Following this victory, Sundara Pandyan redirected his military focus towards the Cholas. In the ensuing conflict, Rajendra Chola III was vanquished and compelled to acknowledge Pandyan overlordship, marking a significant shift in the balance of power in Tamilagam.

=== Wars against Hoysalas ===
Sundara Pandyan extended his military campaign into the Hoysala dominions along the banks of the river Kaveri, where he successfully seized their southern capital, Kannanur Koppam near Srirangam. The incursion resulted in the death of several prominent Hoysala generals, including Singana, and yielded substantial spoils—horses, elephants, and a considerable cache of gold and treasure. The advance was eventually halted when King Someshwara retreated into his core territories. However, Someshwara's subsequent counteroffensive in 1262 aimed at reclaiming Pandyan lands, ended in failure and his own death, further consolidating Pandyan supremacy in the region.Jatavarman Veera Pandyan I became the governor of the captured territories. The region remained under Pandyan rule till Veera Ballala III recaptured the territory towards the end of the 13th century.

=== Wars against Kadavas ===
Sundara Pandyan besieged the city fortress of Sendamangalam and fought with the Kadava king Kopperunchinga II. However, he restored Kopperunchingan to his throne and gave him his country back. He also conquered Magadai and Kongu countries during his campaigns against the Kadavas and Hoysalas.

=== Invasion of Sri Lanka ===
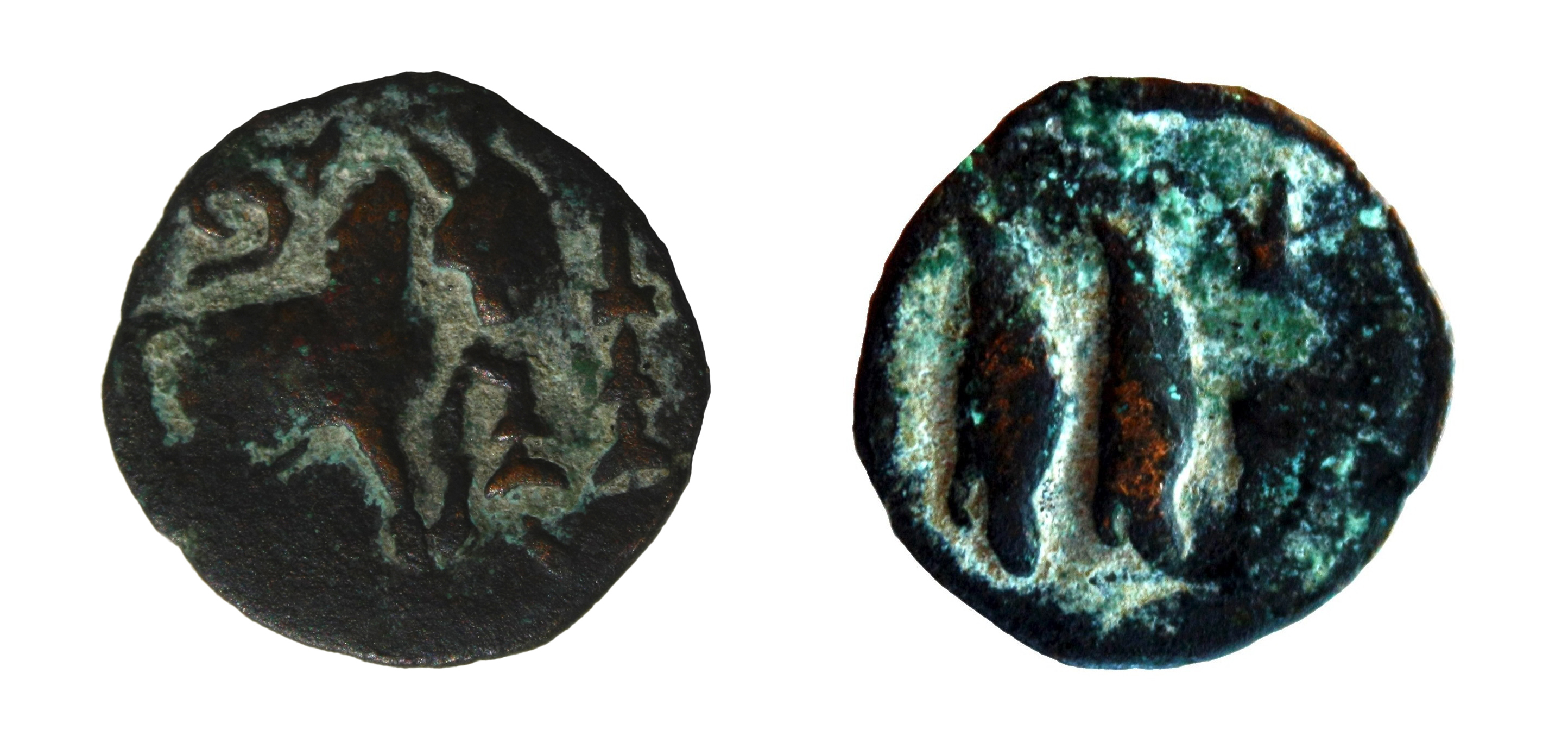
Coin of Jatavarman Sundara I found in Jaffna

Responding to an appeal for help from a minister in Sri Lanka, Jatavarman Sundara Pandyan intervened in 1258 and made Chandrabhanu of Tambralinga, a Savakan usurper of the Jaffna kingdom submit to Pandyan rule and annually offer precious jewels and elephants in tribute. A second attempt by Chandrabhanu to invade the south of the island from the north prompted the Prince Jatavarman Veera Pandyan I, brother and lieutenant of Sundara Pandyan I to intervene again in 1262–1264 on Sundara Pandyan I's behalf. Chandrabhanu was killed in this conquest and the other king of the island was subjugated. Veera Pandyan I proceeded to plant the Pandyan bull victory flag at Koneswaram temple, Konamalai. Chandrabhanu's son Savakanmaindan was installed and submitted to Pandyan rule on the northern Tamil throne before he too was defeated upon Sundara Pandyan I's son Maravarman Kulasekara Pandyan I's, invasion in the late 1270s. Maravarman Kulasekara Pandyan I had succeeded his father as Lord Emperor of Pandyan following the latter's demise in 1268 and invaded to punish the Jaffna monarch for stopping the annual tributes he owed to his Pandyan overlords. The minister in charge of his invasion, Kulasekara Cinkaiariyan, an Aryachakravarthi, was installed as the new king of the island's north. The Aryacakravarti dynasty line of Jaffna rule thus began.

=== Expedition to the North ===
After subduing the Kadava Kopperunchingan II, Sundara Pandyan led an expedition to the North. Manumasiddhi, also known as Vira-gandagopala, the Telugu Chola ruler of Nellore and an ally of Ganapati, faced renewed pressure from the south following the invasion of Jatavarman Sundara Pandya I around c. 1257 CE. This campaign formed part of a broader Pandyan offensive directed against Rajendra Chola III and his associate Vijayagandagopala of Kanchi. The Pandyan forces initially attacked Vijayagandagopala and his ally Kopperunjinga, a Kadava chief; both subsequently submitted to the Pandyas and appear to have cooperated with them in further operations against the Nellore region. In response to these developments, Manumasiddhi II sought assistance from the Kakatiya ruler, as well as from the Seunas and the Bana chief. Epigraphic evidence, including inscriptions found at Tripurantakam within Kakatiya territory, suggests that Rajendra Chola III, Vijayagandagopala, and Kopperunjinga—at this stage acting as subordinates of the Pandyas—were involved in operations that extended into Kakatiya domains Pandyan forces killed the Telugu Choda ruler Vijaya Gandagopala of Nellore Chodas and captured Kanchipuram in 1258. This put them in conflict with the Kakatiyas under Ganapati-deva. Kopperunjinga advanced into the Kakatiya territory, reaching as far as Daksharama, likely with the intention of establishing contact with the ruler of Kalinga, who was an adversary of the Kakatiya monarch. However, Kopperunjinga II was defeated by Ganapati, who at the time was allied with the Pandyas. The Kakatiya ruler is also recorded to have honoured Kopperunjinga II with distinctions, including the presentation of vira-kalal (hero’s anklets).Then Sundara Pandiyan I defeated a Kakatiya army at Mudugur in the current Nellore district and performed a virabisheka to commemorate the end of his campaign. The Battle of Mudugur took place during the Pandyan campaign in the Nellore region. According to Pandyan records and later historical interpretations, the Pandyan army inflicted a significant defeat on the opposing coalition forces, including contingents associated with the Kakatiyas, Seunas, and Banas. The conflict is described as part of a broader series of engagements in which the Pandyan forces advanced northward, reportedly pushing their opponents as far as the banks of the Krishna River (identified in some records as Peraru). The battle weakened the resistance of Manumasiddhi II and his allies. The Kadava Pallava Kopperinjungan II was followed by very weak successors and Sundara Pandyan annexed Kanchi, Nellore and Visayavadai (modern Vijayawada) regions to the Pandyan Kingdom.

== Patronage of temples ==
Sundara Pandyan used the wealth he gained from his victories to fund the restoration of the Shiva temple in Chidambaram and the Vishnu temple in Srirangam. For gilding the roofs of these two temples he was given the title of "pon veindha perumal"(Tamil: பொன் வேய்ந்த பெருமாள்). He also issued grants to temples in Trichy, Thanjavur and Kanchipuram. He built a temple at Aragalur (Magadai Mandalam) for the merit of Kulasekara around 1259. He acknowledged the contributors of other dynasties to Tamil Nadu by building a gate at the Sri Ranganathaswami Temple at Srirangam in which he engraved the names of all the four great empires of Tamil Nadu, namely the Cholas, Pallavas, Pandyas and the Cheras. He also built the East tower of the Madurai Meenakshi Temple. He gilded the gopuram, and placed the gilded Kalasam atop the Ananda Nilayam vimana of Tirumala Venkateswara Temple. In 1263 CE, he renovated the gopuram of Koneswaram temple and his son Veera Pandyan implanted the Pandyan victory flag and insignia of a "Double Fish" emblem at Konamalai.

== Titles ==
Having vanquished his neighbours Sundara Pandyan took the titles like "Emmandalamum Kondaruliya Pandiya", "Tribhuvana Chakravarthy", "Ponveintha Perumal", and "Hemachadana Raja".

His Meikeerthi praises him as "the conqueror of Kongu Nadu and Eelam; the conqueror of the Ganges and Kaveri; Vanquisher of Hoysala; Subjugator of Kadava Kopperunchingan I; The one who paid victory tribute and bravery tribute at Chidambaram; The ruler of three worlds".

(Tamil: கொங்குஈழம் கொண்டு கொடுவடுகு கோடுஅழித்து கங்கை இருகரையும் காவிரியும் கைகொண்டு வல்லாளனை வென்று காடவனைத் திறைகொண்டு தில்லை மாநகரில் வீராபிஷேகமும் விஜயாபிஷேகமும் செய்தருளிய கோச்சடை பன்மரான திரிபுவன்ச் சக்கரவர்த்திகள் ஸ்ரீ வீரபாண்டிய தேவர்).

== Death and succession ==
Sundara Pandyan I was succeeded by Maravarman Kulasekara Pandyan I in 1268 and died in 1271.

A PIL (public interest litigation) was filed by advocate and author B. Jagannath, asking the Central Government to establish a National Council for Development of Tamil language, similar to the Urdu and Sindhi National Council, in the name of Jatavarman Sundarapandyan I. The same is pending at the Madras High Court.

== Bibliography ==
- Sastri, KA Nilakanta (2005) [1955]. A History of South India (Paperback ed.). India: Oxford University Press. ISBN 0-19-560686-8.
- Sethuraman, N (1978). The imperial Pandyas: Mathematics reconstructs the chronology. India: Kumbakonam.
- Narasayya (2009). Aalavaai: Madurai Maanagarathin Kadhai (Hardback ed.). India: Palaniappa Brothers. ISBN 978-81-8379-517-3.
- Aiyangar, Sakkottai Krishnaswami (1921). South India and her Muhammadan Invaders. Oxford University Press.

Preceded by Maravarman Vikkiraman II	Pandya; 1251–1268	Succeeded by Maravarman Kulasekara Pandyan I
