= Maravarman Kulasekara Pandyan I =

Pandyan emperor from 1268 to 1308

- Kollamkonda Pandya, Konerinmaikondaan, Sri Ko Maravarman Thiribhuvana Chakravarthi Sri Kulasekaran

Pandyan Emperor
- Reign: June 1268–1308 (Note: Between 10 and 20 June 1268)
- Predecessor: Jatavarman Sundara Pandyan
- Successor: Vira Pandyan
- Issue: Sundara Pandyan; Vira Pandyan
- Dynasty: Pandyan
- Father: Jatavarman Sundara Pandyan

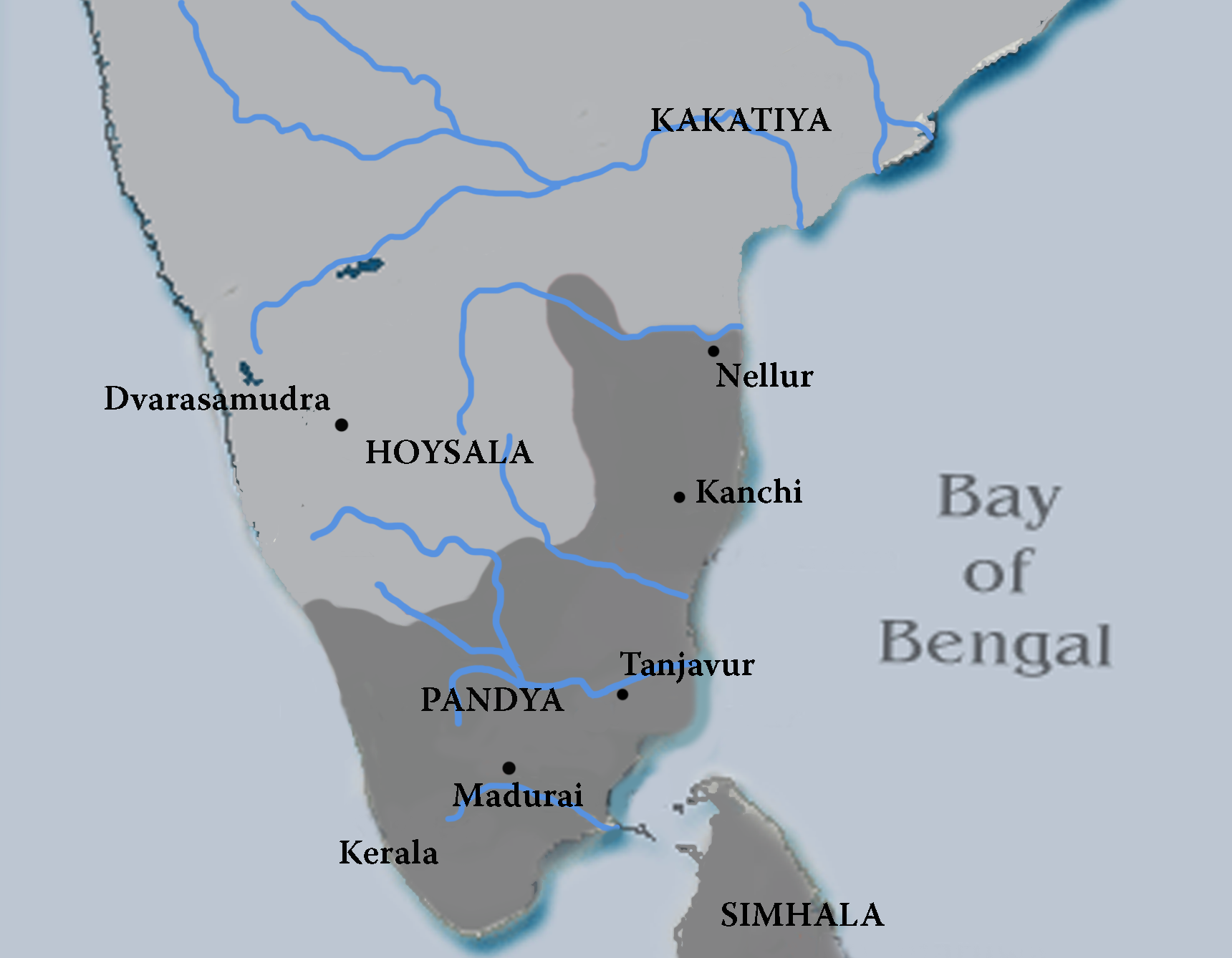
Pandya Kingdom at its greatest extent

Maravarman Kulasekara Pandyan I (Tamil: முதலாம் மாறவர்மன் குலசேகர பாண்டியன்) was a Pandyan emperor who ruled regions of South India between 1268–1308 CE, though history professor Sailendra Sen states he ruled until 1310. In 1279 CE, Maravarman Kulasekara Pandyan ended the rule of Chola dynasty by defeating Rajendra III of Cholas and Ramanatha of Hoysalas. His death lead to the Pandyan Civil War in 1308–1323.

== Accession and shared rule ==
Kulasekara Pandyan I acceded to the Pandyan throne in the year 1268 CE after his father Jatavarman Sundara Pandyan I. During the middle part of the 13th century, the kingdom was ruled by many princes of the royal line. This practice of shared rule with one prince asserting primacy was common in the Pandyan Kingdom. The other princes of the royal family with whom he shared his rule were Jatavarman Vira Pandyan I (1253-1275 CE), his brother Maravarman Vikkiraman III (acceded 1283 CE) and Jatavarman Sundara Pandyan II (acceded 1277 CE). Marco Polo refers to him as the "eldest of five brother kings".

== Military conquests ==
=== Wars against Cholas and Hoysalas ===
Kulasekara Pandyan presided over the second Pandyan empire at its height of power and extension. He warred against the Hoysalas under Ramanatha and the Cholas under Rajendra Chola III. He defeated them both in 1279 CE and ended the nearly 440 years long (840-1280 AD) Chola rule. The defeat of Ramanatha ended the Hoysala control of Tamil Nadu. He also fought a war in the kingdom of Venad in southernmost Kerala, and captured Kollam.

=== Invasion of Sri Lanka ===
Kulasekara Pandyan sent an expedition to Sri Lanka under his minister Kulasekara Cinkaiariyan Aryacakravarti in the late 1270s, defeating Savakanmaindan, a tributary to the Pandyans on the Jaffna kingdom. This expedition plundered the fortress of Subhagiri (Yapahuwa) and returned with the Relic of the tooth of the Buddha. This expedition took place near the end of the Sri Lankan king Bhuvanaikabâhu I's reign (1272-1285 CE). Bhuvanaika Bahu's successor Parâkkamabâhu III went on a personal embassy to Kulasekaran's court and persuaded him to return the relic. Jaffna kingdom was under Pandyan suzerainty for the next twenty years and only regained its independence during the Pandyan Civil war of 1308-1323 that followed Kulasekaran's death.

== Rule, titles and patronage ==
Kulasekaran's long rule of about four decades was one of peace and prosperity according to the foreign travelers who visited the Pandyan country during his reign. The Persian historian Abdulla Wassaf of Shiraz describes the country under Kulasekaran as the most agreeable abode on earth and the most pleasant quarter of the world. He also claims that an Arab Muslim named Takiuddin Abdur Rahman, son of Muhammadut Tibi, was appointed by Kulasekara Pandyan as the prime minister and adviser. He was also bestowed with the coastal cities of Kulasekharapatnam, Kayalpattinam, Fitan and Mali Fitan for his services to the crown.

He gifted a piece of land from his leisure park (Vasantha mandapam) to Kazi Syed Tajuddeen who came from Oman and settled in Madurai. Kazi Syed Tajuddeen constructed a mosque named Kazimar Big Mosque which is still in existence and has been managed by his male descendants continuously for 7 centuries.

Wassaf's accounts which refer to Kulasekaran as Kales Dewar say he ruled for "forty and odd" years, "during which time neither any foreign enemy entered his country, nor any severe malady confined him to bed" and that the treasury of the city of Mardi (Madurai) had "1,200 crores of gold not counting the accumulation of precious stones such as pearls, rubies, turquoises, and emeralds." The term "crore" here means a "hundred thousand" as per the now-defunct Persian number system. It must be mentioned that Wassaf himself never visited any part of India and is generally considered an unreliable source by scholars. The Mahavamsa, while describing the Pandyan plunder of the tooth relic, describes Kulasekaran as "like a sun expanding the lotus-like race of the great Pandyan kings."

Marco Polo visited the Pandyan country during his reign and wrote about the wealth and social customs of Pandyan people. His accounts refer to Kulasekaran as Asciar or Ashcar. Marco Polo describes the Pandyan port city of Kulasekharapatnam as "it is at this city that all the ships touch that come from the west, as from Hormos and from Kis and from Aden, and all Arabia, laden with horses and with other things for sale." Lighthouses can still be seen along the shore which were used to direct ships. In Kulsekarapatnam, small ships known as dhoni operated until 1965. Kulasekharapatnam still has a light house near Manapad, leading to the conclusion that the place Marco Polo mentioned is Kulasekharapatnam. He also wrote about the pearl fisheries, horse trade, sati and devadasis. Also in Kulasekharapatnam now even called Rowther Palayam that a part of it, Rowthers a section of Muslim referred to by that name who had their cavalry and conducted trade with horses.

Kulasekaran built the Manivanneswaram aka Masilamaninathar temple in Tharangambadi. He also built the outer wall of the Thirunelveli Nellaiappar temple. He was given the titles of Kollamkondan (Tamil: கொல்லம் கொண்டான்) meaning "Conqueror of Kollam" and Konerinmaikondan (Tamil: கோ நேர் இன்மை கொண்டான்) meaning "King without equal". Except for the Alwar Thirunagari inscription, all of Kulasekaran's inscriptions do not contain any Meikeerthi. The Alwar Thirunagari inscription from his fourth year of reign (1272 CE) praises him as Sri Ko Maravanman Thiribhuvana Chakravarthi Sri Kulasekaran (Tamil: ஸ்ரீ கோ மாறவன்மரான திரிபுவன சக்கரவர்த்திகள் ஸ்ரீ குலசேகரன்).

== Death and civil war ==
The death of Kulasekara Pandyan I occurred in 1308 CE, a conflict stemming from succession disputes amongst his sons, Jatavarman Sundara Pandyan III, the legitimate and younger son and Jatavarman Veera Pandyan II, the illegitimate older son who was favoured by the king. Accounts from Muslim historians Wassaf and Amir Khusrow say he was killed by Jatavarman Sundara Pandyan III in 1310 CE. This led to the protracted Pandyan Civil War of 1308–1323.

== Notes ==
Preceded by Jatavarman Sundara Pandyan I	Pandya; 1268–1308	Succeeded by Pandyan Civil war of 1308-1323
