= Kulasekara Cinkaiariyan =

Pararacacekaran I
- King of Jaffna
- Reign: 1277–1284
- Predecessor: Savakanmaindan
- Successor: Kulatunga Cinkaiariyan (Cekaracacekaran II)
- Died: 1284
- Issue: Kulatunga Cinkaiariyan (Cekaracacekaran II)
Names
- Kulasekara Cinkaiariyan
- House: Aryacakravarti dynasty

Kulasekara Cinkaiariyan (reigned from 1277 - 1284) is considered to be the first of the Aryacakravarti dynasty kings to establish his rule over the Jaffna Kingdom in modern Sri Lanka.

According to a Sinhalese primary source Mahavamsa, a warlord named Aryacakravarti invaded the Sinhalese capital of Yapahuwa on behalf of the Pandyan King, Maaravaramban Kulasekara Pandyan I between the years 1277 to 1283. Most historians agree that it was this Arayacakravarti who stayed behind to create the Arayacakravrati dynasty although his descendants claimed origin from Kulankayan Cinkai Ariyan.

== Notes ==
Preceded by Savakanmaindan	Jaffna Kingdom; 1277–1284	Succeeded by Kulotunga Cinkaiariyan
