= Chronology of Tamil history =

The following is a chronological overview of the history of the Tamil people, who trace their ancestry to the Indian state of Tamil Nadu, the Indian union territory of Puducherry, the Northern and Eastern Provinces of Sri Lanka and the Puttalam District of Sri Lanka.

== Pre-Sangam period ==
| Period | Events |
|---|---|
| c. 600 BCE | The production process of Wootz steel began in the 6th century BCE and was exported globally by the Chera dynasty as what was termed as "the finest steel in the world," i.e. Seric Iron to the Romans, Egyptians, Chinese and Arabs by 500 BCE and was used to make the famous damascus blades. |
| c. 600–300 BCE | The Keezhadi excavation site is built. The site is located 12 km southeast of Madurai in Tamil Nadu, near the town of Keezhadi in the Sivagangai district. It comes under the Thiruppuvanam Taluk of the Sivagangai district. A large-scale excavation carried out in Tamil Nadu after the Adichanallur archaeological site. The settlement lies on the bank of the Vaigai River and reflects the ancient culture of the Tamil people. |
| c. 400 BCE | Kaveripattinam, also known as Poompuhar in modern times, is located in Mayiladuthurai district. The ancient port city, which served as a capital of the Chola Dynasty is believed to have been destroyed by the sea. The city functioned as a connecting point between South India with regions like Southeast Asia, the Roman Empire, and Greece. |

== Sangam age ==
| Period | Events |
|---|---|
| c. 300 BCE–200 CE | The Sangam age begins, during which the books of Sangam literature are written. |
| c. 300 BCE | Greek ethnographer Megasthenes describes Madurai as the capital of the Pandya dynasty. |
| c. 250 BCE | Ashoka's inscription recording the four kingdoms (Chera, Cholas, Pandya and Satyaputra) of the ancient Tamil country. |
| c. 205 BCE | Elara, a Tamil prince and contemporary of Sinhalese king Dutugamunu, ursurpes the throne of the Anuradhapura kingdom. He would rule until his defeat by Dutugamunu c. 161 BCE. |
| c. 13 | Greek historian Nicolaus of Damascus meets with an ambassador sent by the Pandyan King to Caesar Augustus, Strabo XV.1–73. |
| c. 1–100 | The Periplus of the Erythraean Sea gives a detailed description of early Chera and Pandya kingdom and mentions a part of the Tamil country as Lymirike (misread as "Damirica" by some modern scholars). |
| c. 77 and 140 | Greco-Roman writers Pliny the Elder and Ptolemy mention Madurai to be ruled by the Pandyans. |
| c. 113–135 | Gajabahu I of the Anuradhapura kingdom, a contemporary of Chera Senguttuvan and Karikala Chola (the Gajabahu synchronism). |
| c. 130 | Chera king Udayanjeral rules in the Chera country. |
| c. 190 | Chera Kadukko Ilanjeral Irumporai rules in the Chera country. |
| c. 200 | Writing becomes widespread and vattezuttu evolves from the Tamil Brahmi, becoming a mature script for writing Tamil. |
| c. 210 | Pandyan king Neduncheliyan rules in Madurai and defeats his enemies at the battle of Talaiyalanganam. |

== Post-Sangam period ==
| Period | Events |
|---|---|
| c. 300–500 | End of the Sangam period, many Tamil epics such as Silappatikaram are written |
| c. 300–590 | Kalabhras invade the Tamil country and displace the traditional rulers from their kingdoms. |

== Pallava and Pandya ==
| Period | Events |
|---|---|
| c. 560–580 | Pallava Simhavishnu retakes power from the Kalabhras in Tondaimandalam. |
| c. 560–590 | Pandyan Kadungon rules from Madurai and displaces the Kalabhras from the south. |
| c. 590–630 | Pallava Mahendravarman I rules in Kanchipuram. |
| c. 610 | Saiva saint Thirunavukkarasar (Appar) converts Mahendravarman from Jainism. |
| c. 628 | Chalukya Pulakesi II invades the Pallava kingdom and lays siege on Kanchipuram. |
| c. 630–668 | Pallava Narasimhavarman I (Mamalla) rules in Tondaimandalam. |
| c. 642 | Pallava Narasimhavarman I launches a counter-invasion into the Chalukya country and sacks Vatapi. Pulakeshin II is killed in battle. |
| c. 640–690 | Pandya Arikesari Parankusa Maravarman rules in Madurai. |
| c. 690–725 | Pallava Rajasimha builds the Kailasanatha temple in Kanchipuram and many of the shore temples in Mamallapuram. |
| c. 710–730 | Pandya king Kochadaiyan Ranadhiran expands the Pandya kingdom into the Kongu country |
| c. 731 | Pandya Maravarman Rajasimha allies with the Chalukya Vikramaditya II and attacks the Pallava king Nandivarmam. |
| c. 735 | Chaluka Vikramaditya II invades the Pallava country and occupies the capital Kanchipuram. |
| c. 760 | Pallava Nandivarman II invades and defeats the Ganga kingdom at the battle of Villande. |
| c. 768–815 | Pandya Parantaka Nedunchadaiyan (Varaguna Pandyan) rules in Madurai. |
| c. 767 | Pandya forces defeat the Pallavas on the south banks of the Kaveri river. |
| c. 800–830 | Varagunan I becomes Pandya king and extends his empire up to Tiruchirapalli by defeating the Pallava king Dandivarman. |
| c. 830–862 | Pandya Sirmara Srivallabha rules in Madurai. |
| c. 840 | Srimara Srivallabha invades the Anuradhapura kingdom and captures the northern provinces of king Sena I of Anuradhapura. |
| c. 848 | The rise of Vijayalaya Chola in Tanjavur after the defeat of the Muttaraiyar. |
| c. 846–869 | Pallava Nadivarman III leads an invasion against the Pandya kingdom and defeats the Pandyas at the battle of Tellaru. The territory of the Pallava kingdom now extends to the river Vaigai. |
| c. 859 | Pandya Srivallaba defeats the Pallavas in battle at Kumbakonam. |
| c. 862 | Sinhalese forces led by Sena II of Anuradhapura invade the Pandyan kingdom and sack Madurai. Srimara is killed in battle. |

== Chola period ==
| Period | Events |
|---|---|
| c. 903 | Chola king Aditya I defeats the Pallava king Aparajitavarman. |
| c. 949 | Battle of Takkolam. |
| c. 985 | Accession of Rajaraja Chola I. |
| c. 1010 | Rajaraja completes the Brihadisvara Temple. |
| c. 1012 | Accession of Rajendra Chola I. |
| c. 1017 | Rajendra invades and annexes the Anuradhapura kingdom. Cholas capture the crown, queen, daughter, and wealth of King Mahinda V of Anuradhapura and take king himself as a prisoner to Tamil Nadu, where he eventually died in exile in 1029. |
| c. 1023 | Rajendra's Expedition to the Ganges. |
| c. 1025 | Chola navies defeat the king of Srivijaya |
| c. 1054 | Rajadhiraja Chola dies in the battle of Koppam against Western Chalukyas |
| c. 1070 | Accession of Kulothunga Chola I |
| c. 1118 | Vikrama Chola |
| c. 1133 | Kulothunga Chola II |
| c. 1146 | Rajaraja Chola II |
| c. 1163 | Rajadhiraja Chola II |
| c. 1178 | Kulothunga Chola III |
| c. 1216 | Rajaraja Chola III |
| c. 1246 | Rajendra Chola III |

== Chola to Pandya transition ==
| Period | Events |
|---|---|
| c. 1190–1260 | Bana Dynasty rule begins in Magadaimandalam with family title of 'ponparappinan' and headquarters at Aragalur. |
| c. 1215 | Kalinga Magha invades Sri Lanka leading to the fall of the Polonnaruwa kingdom. The Jaffna kingdom, a Tamil kingdom in Sri Lanka, is established. |
| c. 1216–1238 | The Kadava dynasty and Maravarman Sundara Pandyan establish rule over regions of South India. |

== Pandiya revival and Muslim rule ==
| Period | Events |
|---|---|
| 1251 | Accession of Jatavarman Sundara Pandyan I. |
| 1279 | End of the Chola dynasty with the death of Rajendra Chola III. |
| 1268–1310 | Kulasekara Pandiyan rules in Madurai. |
| 1308 | Malik Kafur, a general of Alauddin Khalji, invades Devagiri en route to Tamil Nadu. |
| 1310 | Sundara Pandian III, son of Kulasekara Pandiyan, appointed as co-regent by his father. This angered his other son Vira Pandyan and prompted him to kill his father and defeat his elder brother, who then fled to Alauddin Khalji to become king. |
| 1311 | Malik Kafur invades the Pandiya country and attacks Madurai. |
| 1327–1370 | Madurai under the rule of the Madurai Sultanate. |

== Tenkasi Pandyas, Vijayanagar and Nayak period ==
| Period | Events |
|---|---|
| 1370 | Bukka, ruler of the Vijayanagara Empire and his son Kumara Kamapna capture Madurai from madurai sultanate and annex with Vijayanagar. |
| 1375 | Rajanarayana Sambuvarayar allied with the Vijayanagar ruler Harihara I against the Sultanate of Madura but was later betrayed and killed by Harihara's brother Bukka Raya I & Bukka raya's son Kumara Kampana who sought to bring most of South India under his rule. |
| 1428 | Sadaavarman Parakrama Pandya started to rule from tenkasi Tenkasi Pandyas, making tenkasi as capital |
| c. 1447–1450 | Bhuvanaikabahu VI of Kotte conquers the Jaffna kingdom, and the kingdom becomes a part of the Sinhalese kingdom of Kotte. |
| 1467 | The Jaffna kingdom regains independence from the kingdom of Kotte. |
| 1518 | The Portuguese land on Coromandel Coast in Pulicat. |
| 1525 | The Chola ruler Veerasekara Chola invaded the Madurai country and deposed the Pandya king Chandrasekara Pandyan. The Pandya king asked help from Vijayanagara, and an expedition under Kotikam Nagama Nayaka was sent to his aid. Nagama suppressed the Chola ruler and took Madurai, but then suddenly he threw off his allegiance and declining to help the Pandya king, usurped the throne and his son Viswanatha Nayak founded Madurai Nayak dynasty under the protection of the Vijayanagar. |
| 1532–1580 | Sevappa Nayak rules as the first independent Nayak ruler in Tanjavur. |
| 1547 | Vettum Perumal pandiyar, A pandiyan king ruling Tirunelveli along with his soldiers were attacked unexpectedly by Vijayanagara Nayak invaders. In this attack ten Pandiya soldiers were killed. To commemorate the death of these ten soldiers, ten Hero stones were installed and the stones are now exhibited in the Tirunelveli museum. |
| 1560–1621 | Portuguese conquest of the Jaffna kingdom – the Portuguese invade and annex the Jaffna kingdom and take king Cankili II as a POW, thus marking the end of the Jaffna kingdom. |
| 1609 | The Dutch establish a settlement in Pulicat. |
| 1616 – 1617 | Battle of Toppur the battle which cause the complete disintegration of the Vijayanagar Empire, which was reviving slowly. This civil war caused severe problems to the Vijayanagara Empire.. |
| 1620–1625 | With the death of Kollankondan son of pandian king Varagunarama Pandya, The Tenkasi Pandyas kingdom ends. |
| 1625 | With no inheritors in Ponnjar royal family, The Poonjar dynasty, A branch of Pandiyan kingdom ends. However another pandian branch continues to rule as Pandalam dynasty till 1820 in present day kerala |
| 1600–1645 | Ragunatha Nayak, the greatest of the Tanjavur Nayaks. |
| 1659 | Ragunatha Sethupathi saves madurai from Mysore/ Vijayanagar raid in the war of noses., While Tirumalai Nayak rules in Madurai |
| 1639 | The British East India Company purchases Chennapatinam and establishes Fort St. George. |
| 1652 | Tanjavur and Gingee fall to the Bijapur Sultan. |
| 1656 | Mysore army invades Salem against the Madurai Nayak Tirumalai., Ramnad king, Raghunatha Sethupathi win the war against mysore army and helps Tirumalai nayak to recover his kingdom |
| 1676 | Maratha army from Bijapur marches into Tanjavur, Ekoji declares himself king. |
| 1692 | The Carnatic Sultanate established by Nawab Zulfiqar Ali Khan, a viceroy of the Mughal emperor. |
| 1707 | Raghunatha Kilavan liberated the Marava country (area around Rameswaram) from the control of Madurai Nayak. After defeating Rani Mangammal’s army, he declared independent Marava country in 1707 and annexed some territories Aranthangi, Thirumayam, Piranmalai of Madurai kingdom. |
| 1746 | Bertrand-François Mahé de La Bourdonnais of the French East India Company attacks and captures Fort St. George from the British. |

== East India Company ==
| Period | Events |
|---|---|
| 1749 | British regain Fort St. George through the Treaty of Aix-la-Chapelle, arising out of the War of the Austrian Succession. |
| 1751 | Robert Clive attacks Arcot and captures it. |
| 1756 | The British and the French sign the first Carnatic treaty. Mahommed Ali Walajah is recognized as Nawab of the Carnatic |
| 1759 | The French, led by Thomas Arthur, Comte de Lally, attack Madras. |
| 1760 | The Battle of Vandavasi between the British and the French. |
| 1767 | Hyder Ali, Sultan of Mysore attacks Madras against the British, but is defeated by the British at the Battle of Chengam. |
| 1773 | The British Government passes the Regulating Act. The administration of Madras comes under British government review. |
| 1777–1832 | Serfoji II rules in Tanjavur. |
| 1799 | Serfoji cedes the Tanjavur kingdom to the British. |
| 1801 | Maruthu Pandiyar of Sivaganga organise the South Indian Chieftains against the East India Company. After a series of battles, they were captured and hanged in Tiruppathur Fort. |
| 1803 | Bentinck appointed governor of Madras. |
| 1800–1805 | Poligar Wars |
| 1806 | The Vellore Mutiny: Indian soldiers of the East India Company Vellore mutiny against governor William Bentinck in Vellore fort. 114 British officers are killed and 19 mutineers are executed. |

== British rule ==
| Period | Events |
|---|---|
| 1892 | British government passes the Indian Councils Act. |
| 1909 | Minto-Morley Reforms – Madras Legislative Council formed. |
| 1920 | 1920 Madras Presidency Legislative Council election – the first regional elections held in Madras. The Justice Party wins the election without any significant opposition and forms a government. |
| 1927 | The Madras Congress passes a resolution for "full independence" |
| 1928 | The Simon Commission visits Madras. Mass protests result in several deaths. |
| 1937 | The Indian National Congress (INC) led by C. Rajagopalachari wins the 1937 legislative council elections and forms a government in Madras, defeating the incumbent Justice Party which held power for nearly 17 years. |
| 1938 | E. V. Ramasamy organises a separatist agitation demanding Dravida Nadu, a proposed sovereign state for the speakers of Dravidian languages in South India, consisting of the Indian states of Madras, Karnataka, Andhra Pradesh and Kerala. |
| 1944 | "Periyar" E.V. Ramasamy and C. N. Annadurai establish the Dravidar Kazhagam (DK). |
| 1944 | The All Ceylon Tamil Congress (ACTC), the first Sri Lankan Tamil political party, is founded by G. G. Ponnambalam. |

== Post-independence period ==
| Period | Events |
|---|---|
| 1947 | The Madras Presidency, comprising Tamil Nadu and parts of Andhra Pradesh and Karnataka is established |
| 1949 | C. N. Annadurai splits from the DK to form the Dravida Munnetra Kazhagam (DMK). |
| 1949 | A group of three Sri Lankan Tamil politicians, S. J. V. Chelvanayakam, C. Vanniasingam and Senator E. M. V. Naganathan, split from the ACTC to form the Ilankai Tamil Arasu Kachchi (ITAK). |
| 1953 | Madras State comes into being along linguistic lines. |
| 1956 | The Official Language Act (No. 33 of 1956), also known as the Sinhala Only Act, is passed by the Parliament of Ceylon. The act replaced English with Sinhala as the sole official language of Ceylon, with the controversial exclusion of Tamil. |
| 1958 | The Sinhala Only Act is amended and the Tamil Language (Special Provisions) Act of 1958 is passed in Ceylon, thus making Tamil an official language of Ceylon. |
| 1965 | Widespread anti-Hindi agitations in response to the union government's decision to make Hindi as the national language of India. |
| 1967 | An alliance led by the DMK wins the 1967 Madras elections and replaces the INC government in Madras State; C. N. Annadurai becomes the first non-INC Chief Minister of Madras post-independence. |
| 1969 | Madras state is renamed as Tamil Nadu (country of the Tamils). |
| 1972 | After decades of oppression of Sri Lankan Tamils by the Sinhalese government, Velupillai Prabhakaran founds the Tamil New Tigers, which would later be renamed as the Liberation Tigers of Tamil Eelam (LTTE) in 1976. It was a Sri Lankan Tamil militant group which advocated for the creation of an independent state of Tamil Eelam in the Northern and the Eastern Provinces of Sri Lanka. |
| 1983–2009 | The Sri Lankan Civil War is fought between the Sri Lanka Army and the Liberation Tigers of Tamil Eelam. It ended in May 2009 with the total military defeat of the LTTE, the killing of Velupillai Prabhakaran and a total of 80,000–100,000 deaths. |

== See also ==
- History of Tamil Nadu
- Tamil culture
- Tamil diaspora
