= Kopperunchinga II =

Kadava chieftain

Kopperunchinga II (reigned c. 1243-1279 CE) was a Kadava chieftain, who succeeded his father Kopperunchinga I and continued his successes against the Hoysalas. Since the Chola power no longer constituted a threat, Kopperunchinga II acted as the de facto protector of the Chola king and helped him maintain his position on the throne. As he expanded his territorial holdings, Kopperunchinga II assumed such titles as Maharajasimha, Khadgamalla, Kadava Pallava, Alappirandan, Avaniyalappirandan, Kanakasabhapathy, etc. He has left numerous inscriptions mainly in the present Cuddalore, Viluppuram, Mayiladuthurai and Chengalpattu districts and a few have also been found in the erstwhile North Arcot district and Chittoor district. A Thiruvannamalai inscription mentions that he drove the telungar to the north to perish. Ultimately, however, the resurgence of the power of the Pandya kingdom of Madurai ended Kopperunchinga's reign and the Kadava dynasty.

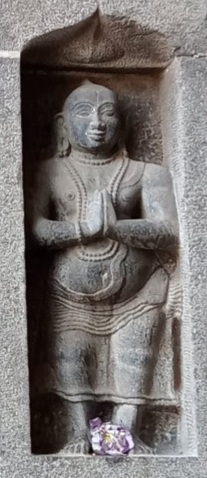
Kopperunchinga II Sculpture in a wall at Nataraja Temple in Chidambaram, Tamil Nadu

== Expansion of Kadava power ==
Kopperunchinga II followed his father to the throne in the early months of 1243 CE. His residence was at Sendamangalam, where his father had established the Kadava capital. At the outset of his reign, his lands extended from Kanchipuram in the north to near Kumbakonam in the south. The territories north of Kanchipuram and the remaining parts of ancient Tondaimandalam up to Tiruvenkadam (modern-day Tirupathi) were conquered during his reign. (In an inscription Kopperunchinga claims to have created a sea of blood from the bodies of his slain enemies.)

The political situation of the Tamil country was at first very favorable for Kopperunchinga II not only to continue the consolidation of the Kadava territories but to expand them. The Kadavas' main adversary, the Hoysalas, had fought the Kadava army in many battles during Kopperunchinga I's reign; but in Kopperunchinga II's time, his Hoysala contemporary Somesvara II stayed away from the Tamil country, as he was busy maintaining his precarious position at home.

== Relationship with Cholas and Pandyas ==
Meanwhile, Kopperunchinga actively assisted Rajendra Chola III to ascend the Chola throne and acted as his protector. The Chola territories were now confined to the area around Thanjavur and portions of Tiruchi. Kopperunchinga was much the stronger ruler, and as a result, the Chola king was practically his feudatory. The former would continue to issue records under his name. Chidambaram, the temple town favored by the Cholas, now lay within the Kadava territories. As some of Rajendra Chola III's inscriptions are found in places under Kopperunchinga's control, we may assume that these two rulers were acting as allies both against the Kakatiya dynasty and against the Pandyas to the south, who historically had been enemies to both Pallavas and Cholas.

Kopperunchinga's relationship with the Pandya king Jatavarman Sundara Pandyan, though by no means cordial, somehow never led to outright war. This is because Kopperunchinga at the time was engaged in prolonged wars against other rulers of Karnataka and the Telugu chiefs, and his repeated successes against them indirectly helped the Pandya king. An inscription of Kopperunjinga in Chidambaram describes his war against Sundara Pandyan referred to therewith as sundarattol.

== The End of the Kadavas ==
Kopperunchinga's fortunes changed in 1268 CE, when Maravarman Kulasekara Pandyan I ascended the Pandya throne. Under his leadership the Pandya armies swept across the Tamil country, extending Pandya rule over the entire South Indian peninsula up to the River Krishna in the north. During this process, Kopperunchinga II, along with his Chola ally, evidently were completely sidelined. We hear no more of the Kadavas or the Cholas after 1279 CE. All the painstaking efforts at recovery and their continual wars to "tame the excessive pride of age of Kali" unfortunately led to their going down fighting while their opportunistic foes like the Pandyans gained for their efforts.

== See also ==
- Pallava dynasty
- Chola dynasty
