= Kopperunchinga I =

Kadava chieftain

- Jiya-Mahipati, Alagiyasiyan, Sakalbhuvana-chakravartin Kopperunjinga and Manavalapperumal
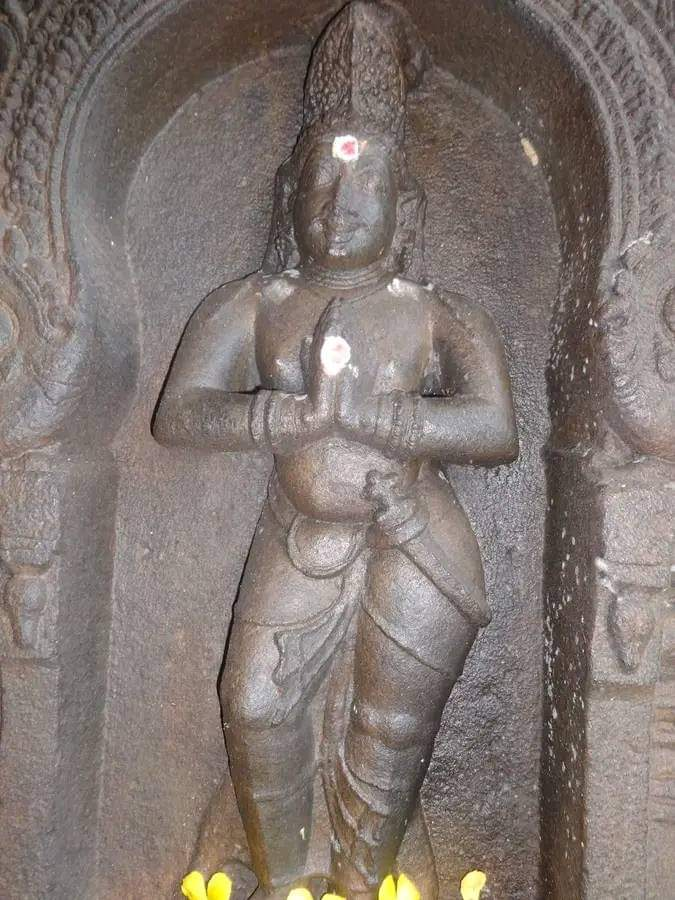
- Reign: c. 1216 – c. 1242 CE
- Predecessor: Dynasty established
- Successor: Kopperunchinga II
- Died: 1242 CE
- House: Pallavas
- Dynasty: Kadava
- Religion: Hinduism

Kopperunchinga I (reigned c. 1216–1242 CE) was a Kadava chieftain. He played a major role in the political affairs of Tamil country. Once an official in the service of the Chola king Kulothunga Chola III (1178-1218), Kopperunchinga utilized the opportunity arising out of the Pandyan invasion of the Chola country to become an independent king. Inscriptions of Kopperunchinga I are few since his kingdom was still forming during most of his life, while he was actively engaged in conflict with other powers.

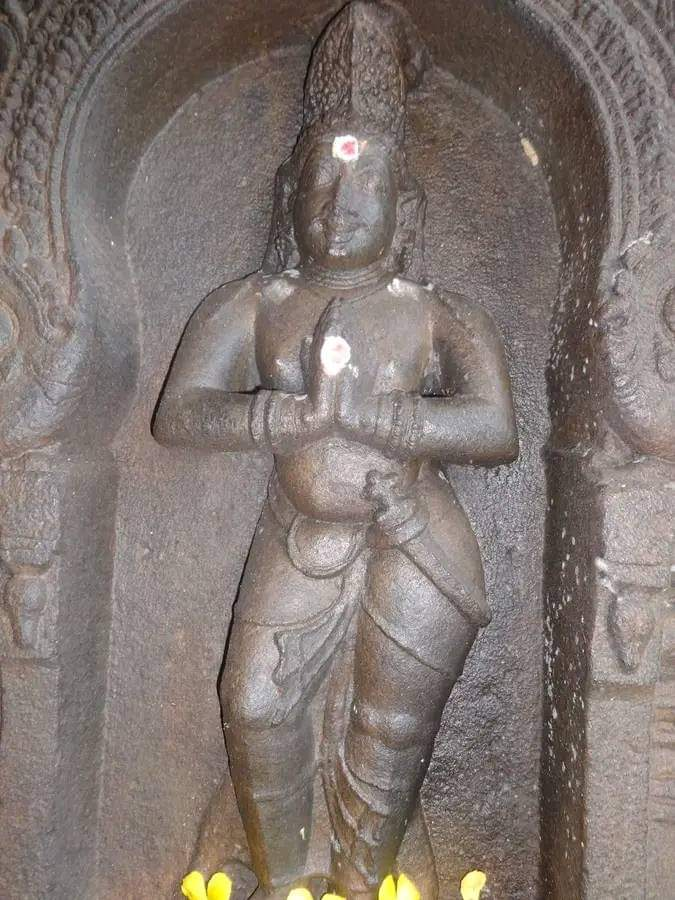
Kopperunchinga I

== Life ==
Kopperunchinga I, who is referred to variously as Jiya-Mahipati, Alagiyasiyan, Sakalbhuvana-chakravartin Kopperunjinga and Manavalapperumal, was a subordinate of Kulothunga Chola III between 1191 and 1195. During this period the Chola empire was declining after many years of glory. During the final years of Kulothunga III's rule, the Pandya Maravarman Sundara Pandya defeated his son Rajaraja III and made the Chola subordinate to Pandya rule; thus marking the beginning of the final demise of the Cholas. Kopperunchinga I, though related to the Chola king by marital ties and an officer in his government until c. 1213, took advantage of the confusion, by strengthening his personal position. He garrisoned the town of Sendamangalam in the present Kallakurichi district, converting it into a military stronghold.

== Consolidation ==
=== Conflicts with Yadavas and Hoysalas ===
Kopperunchinga's ambition brought him into conflict with Yadava king Singhana II, with whom he fought a battle at Uratti in 1222 or 1223 CE. Soon after this he fought Hoysala king Vira Narasimha II in 1224. The Hoysala king won this battle and the Kadavas were suppressed for a while. On re-establishing the supremacy previously exercised by the Cholas, the Hoysala king assumed the titles Establisher of the Chola country and Destroyer of the demon Kadavaraya.

=== Defeat of the Cholas ===
Kopperunchinga's defeat at the hands of the Hoysalas did not hold him back long. He defeated the Chola king Rajaraja Chola III at the battle of Tellaru and imprisoned the king and his ministers at Sendamangalam in 1231-1232. Rajaraja Chola III immediately appealed to the Hoysala king for help. A Chola inscription states that Kopperunchinga was helped by the Lanka king Parakrama Bahu II in the battle. To signify his victory Kopperunchinga I assumed the title Sakalabhuvanachakravartin (Emperor of the Universe) and the epithet Solanai-sirai-yittu-vaittu Solanadu-konda Alagiyasiyan (Alagiasiyan who imprisoned the Chola and conquered the Chola country).

=== Defeat of the Hoysalas ===
While the Hoysala king was preparing to lay siege to Kopperunchinga's capital of Sendamangalam to counter the Kadava's rise, Kopperunchinga engaged the Hoysala armies at Perumbalur near Tiruchi in 1241 and killed the Hoysala generals Kesava, Harihara-Dandanayaka and others and seized their women and property. To protect against further attacks from the Hoysalas, Kopperunchinga built a fort at Tiruvenkadu on the banks of the river Kaveri. At the time of his death in 1242, he left his kingdom in a strong position. The king informs through an inscription as to how prior to his expedition against both Sundara Pandyan and Hosal. In a dream he was ordered by Goddess Mother Earth to destroy the evil kingdoms that were burdening her.

==== Extent of influence ====
The Pallava king seems to have had extensive influence over the Deccan and other parts of subcontinent. A festival in his honor was conducted in ancient temples at Sree Kalahasti (now in Andrha Pradesh), Draksharama coincided with the king's natal asterism of Tiruvonam. This is evidenced in epigraphs. The Pallava chief seems to have had extensive influence in the Asian region as traders from kingdoms on banks of river ganga namely radha desam (southern UP) visited the country to trade. An official called Kambujattu Acharya from Kambujadesam (Vietnam), came and took charge as a priestly official at Srirangam temple during his time. This is evidenced by epigraphs that register an order of the officer Solakon, an officer of Kopperunjingan. It exempted from taxes lands given for the maintenance of gardeners looking after ‘Tiruchchirrambalamudaiyan-tirunandavanam’ garden. It was formed by Gangayar (meaning from banks of ganga) Tiruchchirrambalamudaiyar alias Udaiyar Isvarasivar of Savarnna-gotra and belonging to the Southern Radha country in Uttarapatha (UP). The garden provided garlands to the god Udaiyar Tiruchchirrambalamudaiyar and the goddess Tirukkamakkottamudaiya-Periyanachchiyar.

== Charitable endowments ==
Kopperunchinga I was a patron of Tamil literature. He was addressed by his officials as Devar Tirumeni. A great devotee of the god Nataraja at Chidambaram, he constructed the southern and eastern gopura (towers) of the temple there; he greatly improved the ancient temples at Vennainallur and Vriddhachalam. At this ancient temple at Tiruvennainallur he presented the deity with a necklace containing 2,088 gems, reportedly a personal gift to the king's ancestor by lord Indran, the king of gods, seeking his blessing for victory in war. The temple for goddess Bhagawati (durga) at Chidambaram, which is still a cynosure for the eye was built by him in 1231 A.D. By this the Pallava chieftain marked his victory over the Hoysalas. He undertook many infrastructure activities, laying roads, opening schools and colleges, building water tanks and ponds and canals and improving agricultural infrastructure. He built a library consisting of several stories on the banks of Pennai river. He performed deeds of munificence during a pilgrimage to sacred places on the southern bank of the Kaveri river in Solamandalam.

== See also ==
- Kopperunchinga II
- Pallava dynasty
- Chola dynasty
