= Chola Empire =

Medieval Indian empire (848–1279)

- 848–1279
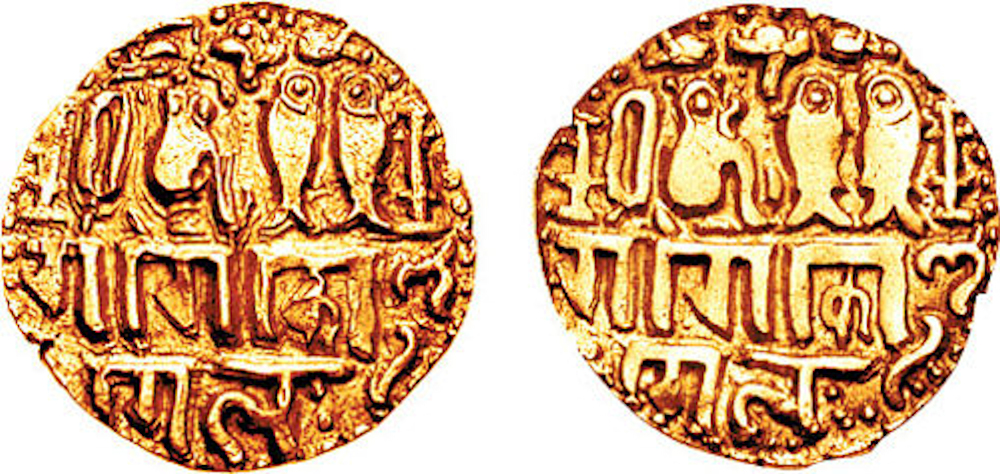
- Gold Gadyana coin of emperor Rajaraja I (985–1014). Uncertain Tamil Nadu mint. Legend "Chola, conqueror of the Gangas" in Tamil, seated tiger with two fish.

- The Chola Empire at its greatest extent c. 1030, under Rajendra I
- Capital: Pazhaiyaarai, Thanjavur, Gangaikonda Cholapuram
- Official languages: Middle Tamil; Classical Sanskrit (liturgical purpose)
- Religion: Hinduism
- Government: Monarchy
- Chakravartigal
  - 848–871: Vijayalaya Chola (first)
  - 1246–1279: Rajendra III (last)
- Historical era: Middle Ages
  - Established: 848
  - Empire at its greatest extent: 1030
  - Disestablished: 1279
Preceded by
Pandya dynasty
Pallava Empire
Chera Kingdom
Eastern Chalukyas
Srivijaya Empire
Tambralinga
Eastern Ganga dynasty
Anuradhapura Kingdom
Principality of Ruhuna
Western Chalukya Empire
Succeeded by
Pandya dynasty
Kingdom of Polonnaruwa
Kakatiya Empire
Eastern Ganga dynasty
Melayu Kingdom
Venad
Hoysala Empire

The Chola Empire (Tamil: [t͡ʃoːɻɐɾ, soːɻɐɾ]), which is often referred to as the Imperial Cholas, was a medieval thalassocratic empire based in southern India that was ruled by the Chola dynasty, and comprised overseas dominions, protectorates and spheres of influence in Southeast Asia.

The power and the prestige the Cholas had among political powers in South, Southeast, and East Asia at its peak is evident in their expeditions to the Ganges, naval raids on cities of the Srivijaya Empire on the island of Sumatra, and their repeated embassies to Song China. The Chola fleet represented the peak of ancient Indian maritime capacity. Around 1070, the Cholas began to lose almost all of their overseas territories but the later Cholas (1070–1279) continued to rule portions of southern India. The Chola Empire went into decline at the beginning of the 13th century with the rise of the Pandya dynasty, which ultimately caused the Chola's downfall.

The Cholas established a centralised form of government and a disciplined bureaucracy. Their patronage of Tamil literature and their zeal for building temples resulted in some of the greatest works of Tamil literature and architecture. The Chola kings were avid builders, and regarded temples in their kingdoms as both places of worship and of economic activity. A prime example of Chola architecture is Brihadisvara Temple at Thanjavur, a UNESCO World Heritage Site, which the Rajaraja commissioned in 1010. They were also well known for their patronage of art. The development of the sculpting technique used in Chola bronzes of Hindu deities that were built using a lost wax process, was pioneered in their time. The Chola tradition of art spread, and influenced the architecture and art of Southeast Asia.

== History ==
=== Founding ===
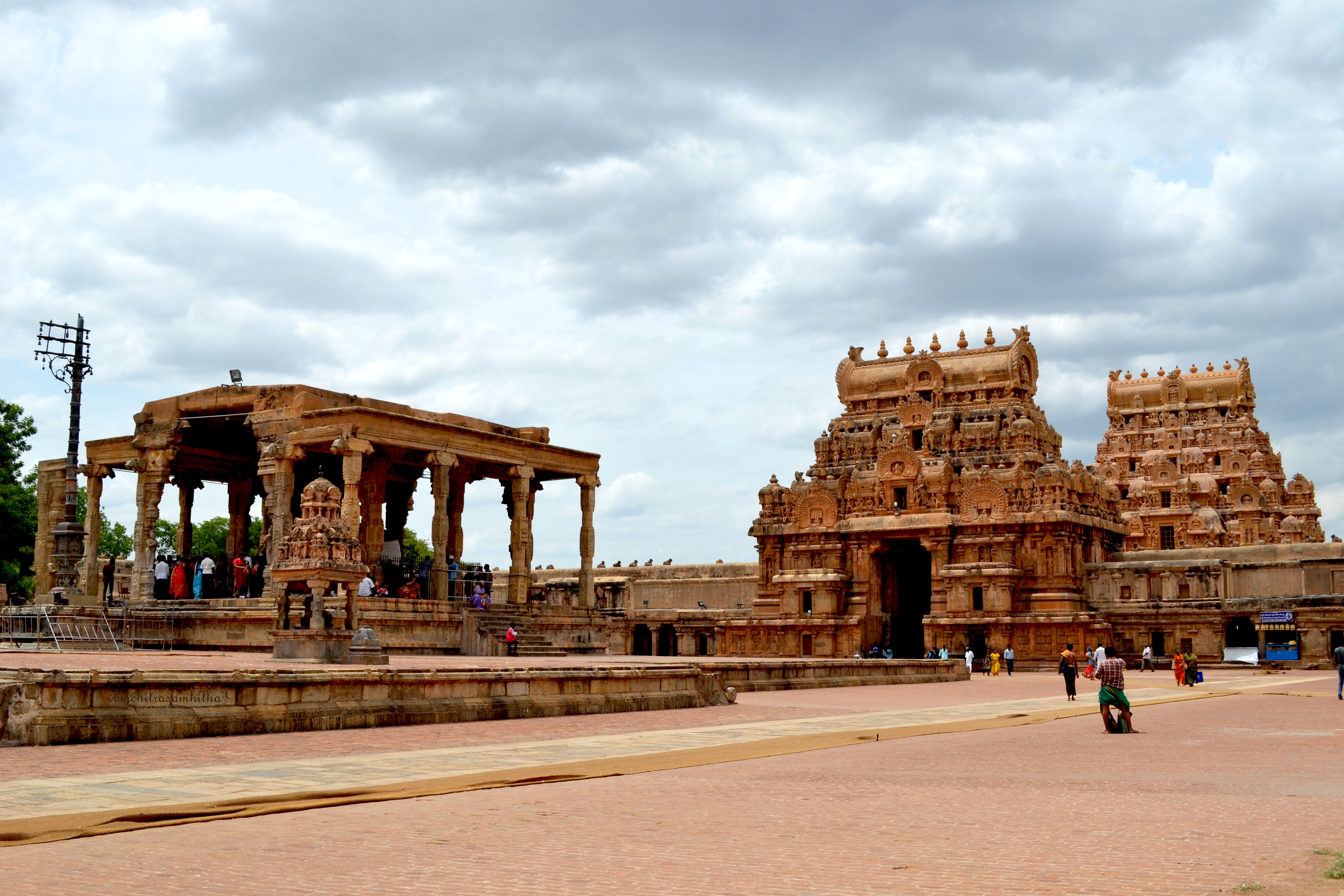
The city of Thanjavur

Vijayalaya, a descendant of the Early Cholas, reestablished resp. founded the Chola Empire in 848 CE. Vijayalaya took an opportunity arising out of a conflict between the Pandya and Pallava empires in c. 850, captured Thanjavur from Muttarayar, and established the imperial line of the medieval Chola dynasty. Thanjavur became the capital of the Imperial Chola empire.

Under Aditya I, the Cholas along with the Pallavas defeated the Pandyan dynasty of Madurai in 885, occupied large parts of Kannada country, and had marital ties with the Western Ganga dynasty. Later, Aditya I defeated the Pallavas and occupied the Tondaimandalam. In 925, Aditya's son Parantaka I conquered Sri Lanka, which was then-known as Ilangai. Parantaka I also defeated the Rashtrakuta dynasty under Krishna II in the Battle of Vallala. Later, Parantaka I was defeated by Rashtrakutas under Krishna III and the Cholas' heir apparent Rajaditya Chola was killed in the Battle of Takkolam, in which the Cholas lost Tondaimandalam region to Rashtrakutas.

The Cholas recovered their power during the reign of Parantaka II. The Chola army under the command of crown prince Aditha Karikalan defeated the Pandyas and expanded the kingdom to Tondaimandalam. Aditha Karikalan was assassinated in a political plot. After Parantaka II, Uttama Chola became the Chola emperor and was followed by Raja Raja Chola I, the greatest Chola monarch.

=== Imperial era ===
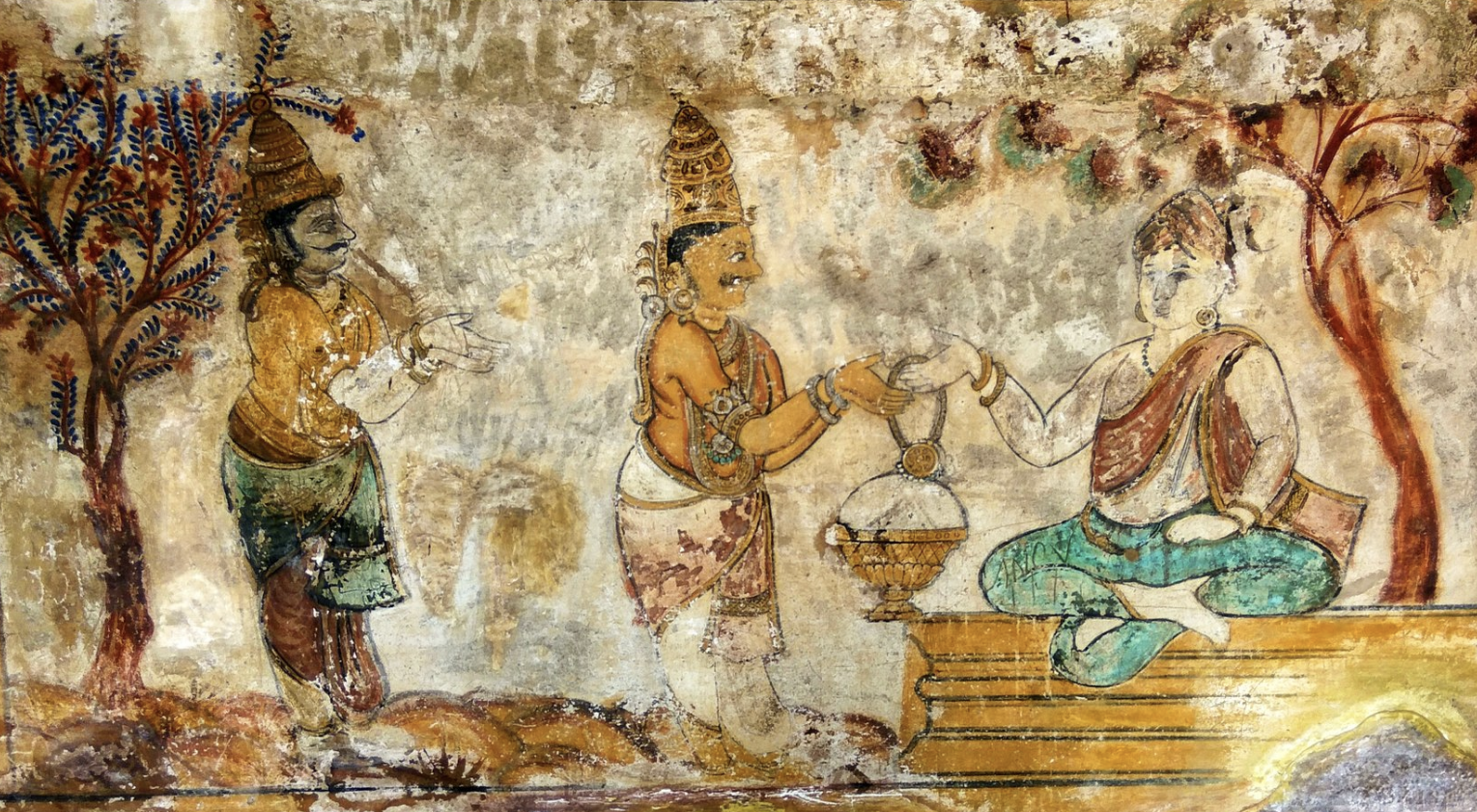
Chola princes Aditha Karikalan and Arulmozhi Varman meeting their guru

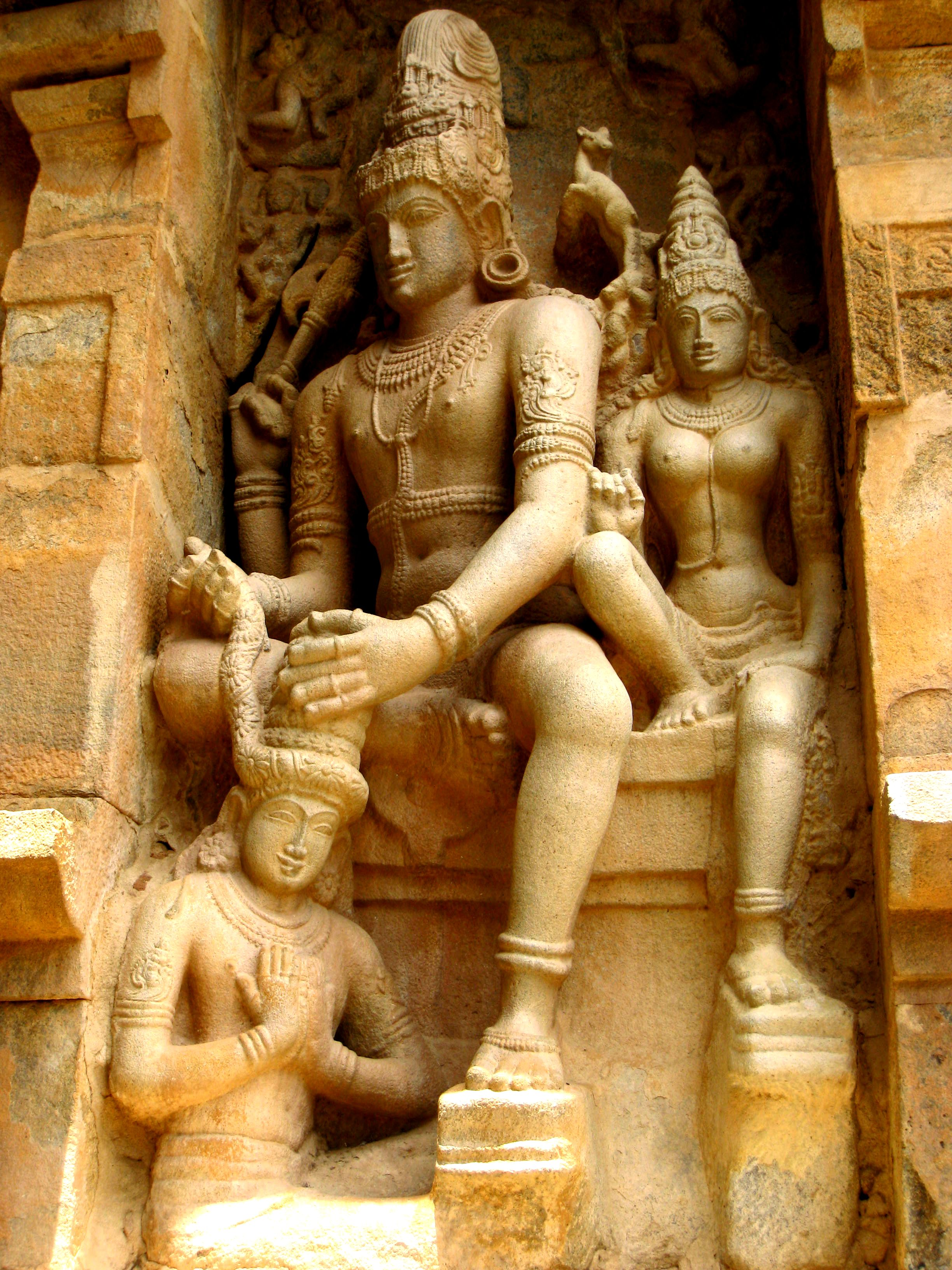
Rajendra I proclaimed as Emperor by Shiva and Shakthi

Under Rajaraja I and Rajendra I, the Chola Empire reach its Imperial state. At its peak, the empire stretched from the northern parts of Sri Lanka northwards to the Godavari–Krishna river basin, up to the Konkan coast in Bhatkal, the entire Malabar Coast (the Chea country) in addition to Lakshadweep and the Maldives islands. Rajaraja Chola I was an energetic ruler who applied himself to the task of governance with the same zeal he had shown in waging wars. He integrated his empire into a tight, administrative grid under royal control and strengthened local self-government. In 1000, Rajaraja conducted a land survey to effectively marshall his empire's resources. He built Brihadeeswarar Temple in 1010.

Rajendra conquered Odisha and his armies continued north and defeated the forces of the Pala dynasty of Bengal, and reached the Ganges river in northern India. Rajendra built a new capital called Gangaikonda Cholapuram to celebrate his victories in northern India. Rajendra I successfully invaded the Srivijaya kingdom in Southeast Asia, which led to the decline of the empire there. This expedition left such an impression on the Malay people of the medieval period his name is mentioned in the corrupted form as Raja Chulan in the Malay chronicle Sejarah Melayu. Rajendra also completed the conquest of the Rajarata kingdom of Sri Lanka and took the Sinhala king Mahinda V a prisoner; he also conquered Rattapadi—territories of the Rashtrakutas, Chalukya country, Talakkad, and Kolar, where Kolaramma temple still has his portrait statue—in Kannada country. Rajendra's territories included the Ganges–Hooghly–Damodar basin, as well as Rajarata of Sri Lanka and the Maldives. The kingdoms along the east coast of India up to the river Ganges acknowledged Chola suzerainty. Diplomatic missions were sent to China in 1016, 1033, and 1077.

==== Chola–Chalukya wars ====
From the period of Rajaraja, the Cholas engaged in a series of conflicts with the Western Chalukyas. The Old Chalukya dynasty had split into two sibling dynasties, the Western and Eastern Chalukyas. Rajaraja's daughter Kundavai was married to the Eastern Chalukya prince Vimaladitya, who ruled from Vengi. The Western Chalukyas felt the Vengi kingdom was in their natural sphere of influence. Cholas inflicted several defeats on the Western Chalukyas. The frontier mostly remained at the Tungabhadra River for both kingdoms and resulted in the death of king Rajadhiraja.

Rajendra's reign was followed by those of three of his sons in succession; Rajadhiraja I, Rajendra II, and Virarajendra. In his eagerness to restore Chola hegemony over Vengi to its former absolute state, Rajadhiraja I (1042–1052) led an expedition into Vengi country in 1044–1045. He fought a battle at Dhannada and compelled the Western Chalukyan army and Vijayaditya VII to retreat in disorder. Rajendra then entered the Western Chalukyan dominions and set fire to the Kollipaka fort on the frontier between the Kalyani and Vengi territories.

This brought relief for Rajaraja Narendra, who was now firmly in control at Vengi, with Rajadhiraja I proceeding to the Chalukyan capital, displacing the Chalukyan king Someshvara I, performing his coronation at Manyakheta, and collecting tribute from the defeated king, who had fled the battlefield. While the Chalukyans kept creating trouble through Vijayaditya VII, Vengi remained firmly under the control of the Cholas. Someshvara I again launched an attack on Vengi and then the Cholas in 1054.

After Rajadhiraja died, Rajendra II crowned himself on the battlefield. He galvanized the Chola army, defeating the Chalukyas under Someshvara I. The Chalukya king again fled the battlefield, leaving behind his queen and riches in the possession of the victorious Chola army. The Cholas consolidated their hold on Vengi and Kalinga. Although there were occasional skirmishes with the Chalukyas, they were repeatedly defeated by both the Cholas and the Vengi princes, who openly professed loyalty to the Chola Empire. Following the death of Rajaraja Narendra in 1061, another opportunity for the Kalyani court to strengthen its hold on Vengi arose. Vijayaditya VII seized Vengi and with the consent of the Kalyani court, established himself permanently in the kingdom. Meanwhile, prince Rajendra Chalukya, son of Rajaraja Narendra through the Chola princess Ammangai, was brought up in the Chola harem. Rajendra Chalukya married Madhurantakidevi, the daughter of RajendraII. To restore him on the Vengi throne, RajendraII sent his son Rajamahendra and brother ViraRajendra against the Western Chalukyas and Vijayaditya VII. Chola forces marched against Gangavadi and repelled the Chalukyas. Virarajendra then marched against Vengi and probably killed Saktivarman II, son of Vijayaditya VII.

In the midst of this, in 1063, Rajendra II died; because his son Rajamahendra had predeceased him, Virarajendra returned to Gangaikonda Cholapuram and was crowned the Chola king (1063–1070). Virarajendra split the Western Chalukya kingdom by persuading Chalukya prince Vikramaditya IV to become his son-in-law and to seize the throne of Kalyani for himself. When Virarajendra died in 1070, he was succeeded by his son Adhirajendra, who was assassinated a few months later, leaving the Chola dynasty was without a lineal successor in the Vijayalaya Chola line.

=== Later Cholas ===
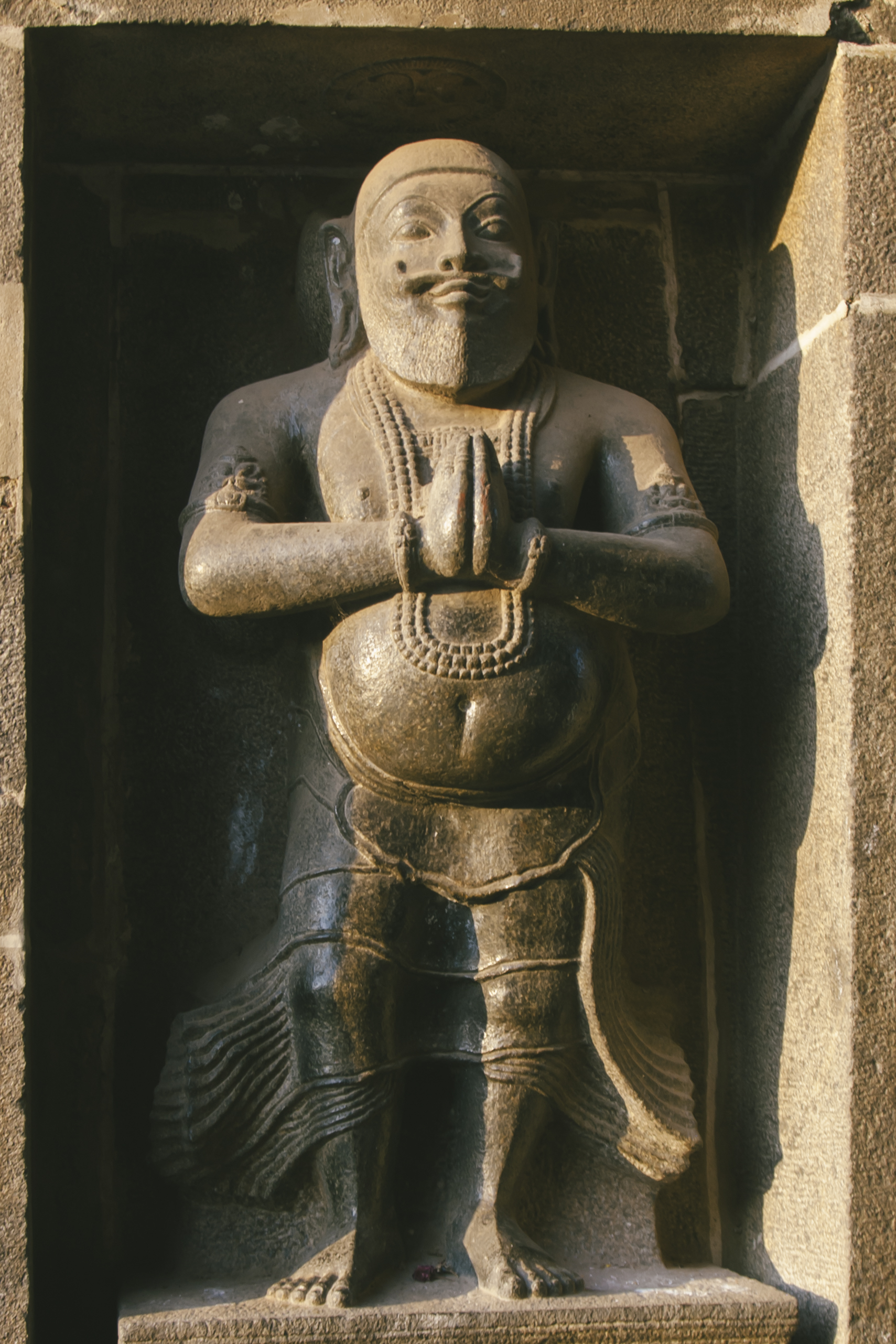
Sculpture of Kulottunga I

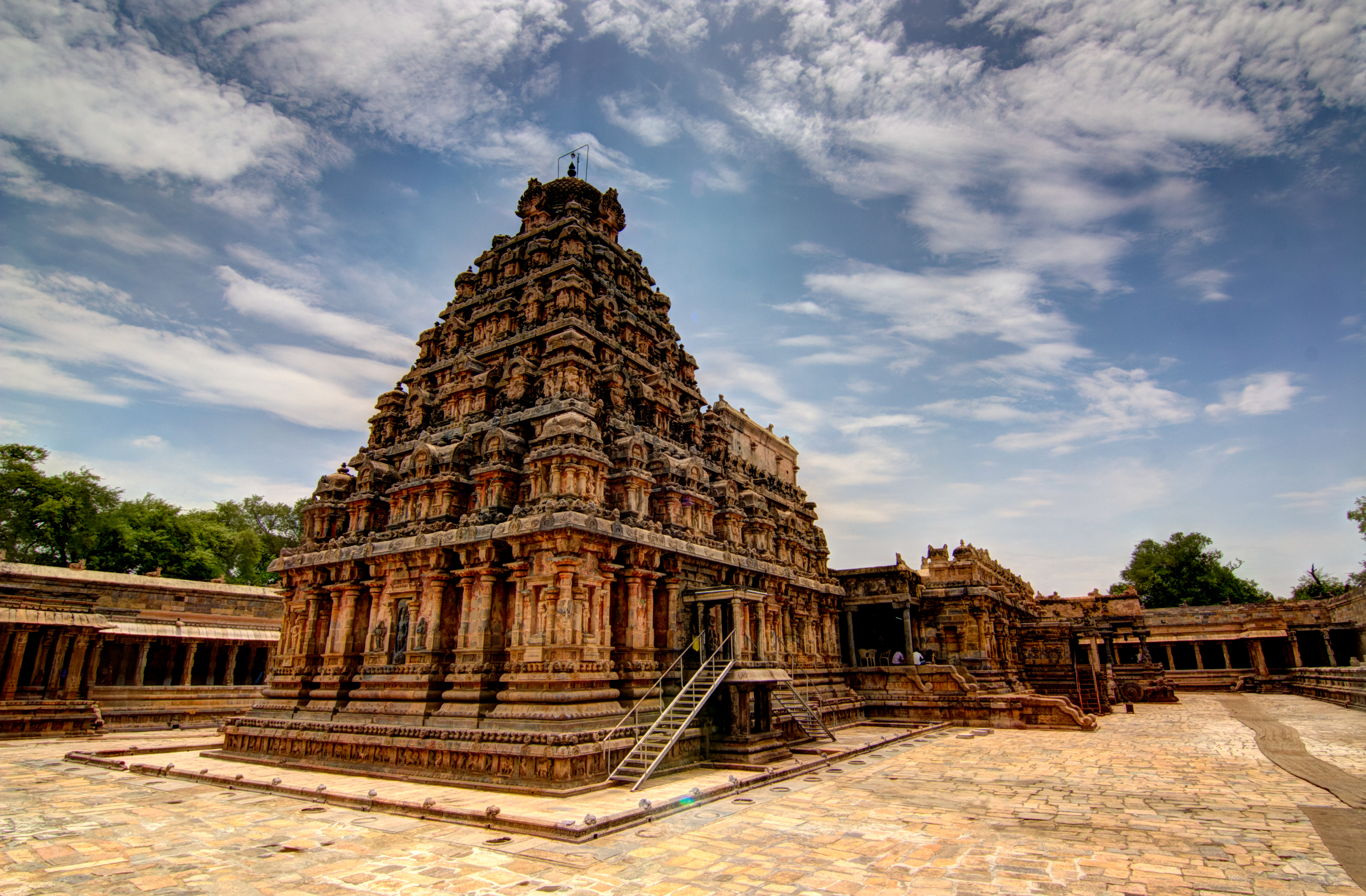
Airavatesvara Temple Built by Rajaraja II.

Marital and political alliances between the Eastern Chalukyas began during the reign of Rajaraja following his invasion of Vengi. Rajaraja Chola's daughter married Chalukya prince Vimaladitya, and Rajendra Chola's daughter Ammanga Devi was married to the Eastern Chalukya prince Rajaraja Narendra. In 1070, Virarajendra Chola's son Athirajendra Chola was assassinated in a civil disturbance, and Kulothunga Chola I, the son of Ammanga Devi and Rajaraja Narendra, ascended the Chola throne, beginning the Later Chola dynasty.

The Later Chola dynasty was led by capable rulers such as Kulothunga I, his son Vikrama Chola, and other successors Rajaraja II, Rajadhiraja II, and Kulothunga III, who conquered Kalinga, Ilam, and Kataha. The rule of the Later Cholas between 1218, starting with Rajaraja III to the last emperor Rajendra III, was not as strong as those of the emperors between 850 and 1215. Around 1118, the Cholas lost control of Vengi to the Western Chalukya and Gangavadi (southern Mysore) districts to the Hoysala Empire. Immediately after the accession of king Vikrama Chola, the son and successor of Kulothunga Chola I, the Cholas recovered the province of Vengi by defeating Chalukya Someshvara III; the Cholas also recovered Gangavadi from the Hoysalas. The Chola empire, though not as strong as between 850 and 1150, was still largely territorially intact under Rajaraja II (1146–1175) a fact attested to by the construction of the third grand, chariot-shaped Airavatesvara Temple at Dharasuram on the outskirts of modern Kumbakonam. Up to 1215, during the rule of Kulothunga Chola III, Chola administration and territorial integrity was stable and very prosperous, but during his rule, Chola power started declining following his defeat by Maravarman Sundara Pandiyan II in 1215–1216. Subsequently, the Cholas also lost control of the island of Sri Lanka and were driven out by the revival of Sinhala power.

The decline of the Cholas was also marked by the resurgence of the Pandyan dynasty as the most powerful rulers in South India. A lack of a controlling central administration in its erstwhile Pandyan territories prompted a number of claimants to the Pandya throne to cause a civil war, in which the Sinhalas and the Cholas were involved by proxy. Details of the Pandyan civil war, and the role played by the Cholas and Sinhalas, are present in the Mahavamsa and Pallavarayanpettai inscriptions.

For three generations, the Eastern Chalukyan princes had married into the imperial Chola family and felt they belonged to it as much as to the Eastern Chalukya dynasty. The Chalukya prince Rajendra Chalukya of Vengi had "spent his childhood days in Gangaikonda Cholapuram and was a familiar favourite to the princes and the people of the Chola country" according to Kalingathuparani, an epic written in praise of him. Following the death of the death of Adhirajendra, Rajendra Chalukya established himself on the Chola throne as Kulottunga I (1070–1122), beginning the Later Chola or Chalukya-Chola period.

Kulothunga I reconciled himself with his uncle Vijayaditya VII and allowed him to rule Vengi for the rest of his life. The Eastern Chalukya line came to an end with Vijayaditya's death in 1075 and Vengi became a province of the Chola Empire. Kulottunga Chola I administered the province through his sons, whom he sent there as viceroys. There was a prolonged fight between Kulottunga Chola I and Vikramaditya VI. Kulothunga's long reign was characterized by unparalleled success and prosperity; he avoided unnecessary wars and earned the admiration of his subjects. Kulottunga's successes resulted in the well-being of the empire for the next 100 years but Kulothunga lost the territories in the island of Lanka and began to lose control of the Pandya territories.

==== Diminished empire ====
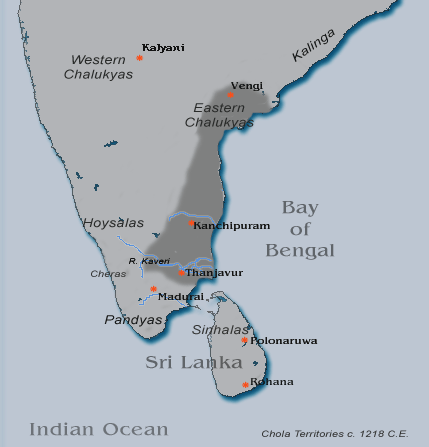
Chola kingdom under Kulothunga III

Under Rajaraja Chola III and his successor Rajendra Chola III, the Later Cholas were quite weak and experienced continuous trouble. One feudatory the Kadava chieftain Kopperunchinga I held Rajaraja Chola III as a hostage for some time. At the close of the 12th century, the growing influence of the Hoysalas replaced the declining Chalukyas as the main player in Kannada country but they also faced constant trouble from the Seunas and the Kalachuris, who were occupying the Chalukya capital. The Hoysalas found it convenient to have friendly relations with the Cholas from the time of Kulothunga Chola III, who had defeated Hoysala Veera Ballala II, who had subsequent marital relations with the Chola monarch. This continued during the time of Rajaraja Chola III, the son and successor of Kulothunga Chola III

The Hoysalas played a divisive role in the politics of Tamil country during this period. They exploited the lack of unity among the Tamil kingdoms and alternately supported one Tamil kingdom against the other, thereby preventing the Cholas and Pandyas from rising to their full potential. During the reign of Rajaraja III, the Hoysalas sided with the Cholas, and defeated the Kadava chieftain Kopperunjinga and the Pandyas, and established a presence in Tamil country. Rajendra Chola III, who succeeded Rajaraja III, was a more competent ruler who led successful expeditions to the north, as attested to by his epigraphs found as far as Cuddappah. He also defeated two Pandya princes, one of whom was Maravarman Sundara Pandya II, and briefly made the Pandyas submit to Chola control. The Hoysalas, under Vira Someswara, were quick to intervene and sided with the Pandyas, and repulsed the Cholas to counter the latter's revival.

In South India, the Pandyas had become a great power that banished the Hoysalas from Malanadu and Kannada country; the Hoysalas were allies of the Cholas on Tamil country. The demise of the Cholas was caused by the Pandyas in 1279. The Pandyas steadily gained control of Tamil country and territories in Sri Lanka, southern Chera country, Telugu country under Maravarman Sundara Pandiyan II and his able successor Jatavarman Sundara Pandyan, before inflicting several defeats on the joint forces of the Cholas under Rajaraja Chola III, and the Hoysalas under Someshwara, his son Ramanatha. From 1215, the Pandyans gradually became a major force in Tamil country and consolidated their position in Madurai-Rameswaram-Ilam-southern Chera country and the Kanyakumari belt, and had been steadily increasing their territories in the Kaveri belt between Dindigul, Tiruchy, Karur, and Satyamangalam and in the Kaveri Delta, Thanjavur, Mayiladuthurai, Chidambaram, Vriddhachalam, and Kanchi. The Pandyans marched to Arcot; Tirumalai, Nellore, Visayawadai, Vengi, and Kalingam by 1250.

The Pandyas steadily routed the Hoysalas and the Cholas, and dispossessed the Hoysalas, defeating them under Jatavarman Sundara Pandiyan at Kannanur Kuppam. At the close of Rajendra's reign, the Pandyan empire was at the height of its prosperity and had replaced the Chola empire in the view of foreign observers. The last-recorded date of Rajendra III is 1279; there is no evidence he was immediately followed by another Chola prince. In around 1279, Kulasekhara Pandiyan routed the Hoysalas from Kannanur Kuppam and in the same war, the last Chola emperor Rajendra III was routed and the Chola empire ceased to exist. The Chola empire was completely overshadowed by the Pandyan empire and sank into obscurity by the end of the 13th century until period of the Vijayanagara Empire.

In the early 16th century, Virasekhara Chola, king of Tanjore, rose out of obscurity and plundered the dominions of the Pandya prince in the south. The Pandya, who was under the protection of the Vijayanagara, appealed to the emperor and the Raya accordingly directed his agent (Karyakartta) Nagama Nayaka, who was stationed in the south, to put down the Chola. Nagama Nayaka then defeated the Chola but the once-loyal officer of Krishnadeva Raya defied the emperor and decided to keep Madurai for himself. Krishnadeva Raya is said to have dispatched Nagama's son Viswanatha, who defeated his father and restored Madurai to Vijayanagara rule. The fate of Virasekhara Chola, the last of the line of Cholas, is not known. It is speculated he either fell in battle or was executed along with his heirs during his encounter with Vijayanagara.

== Administration ==
=== Government ===
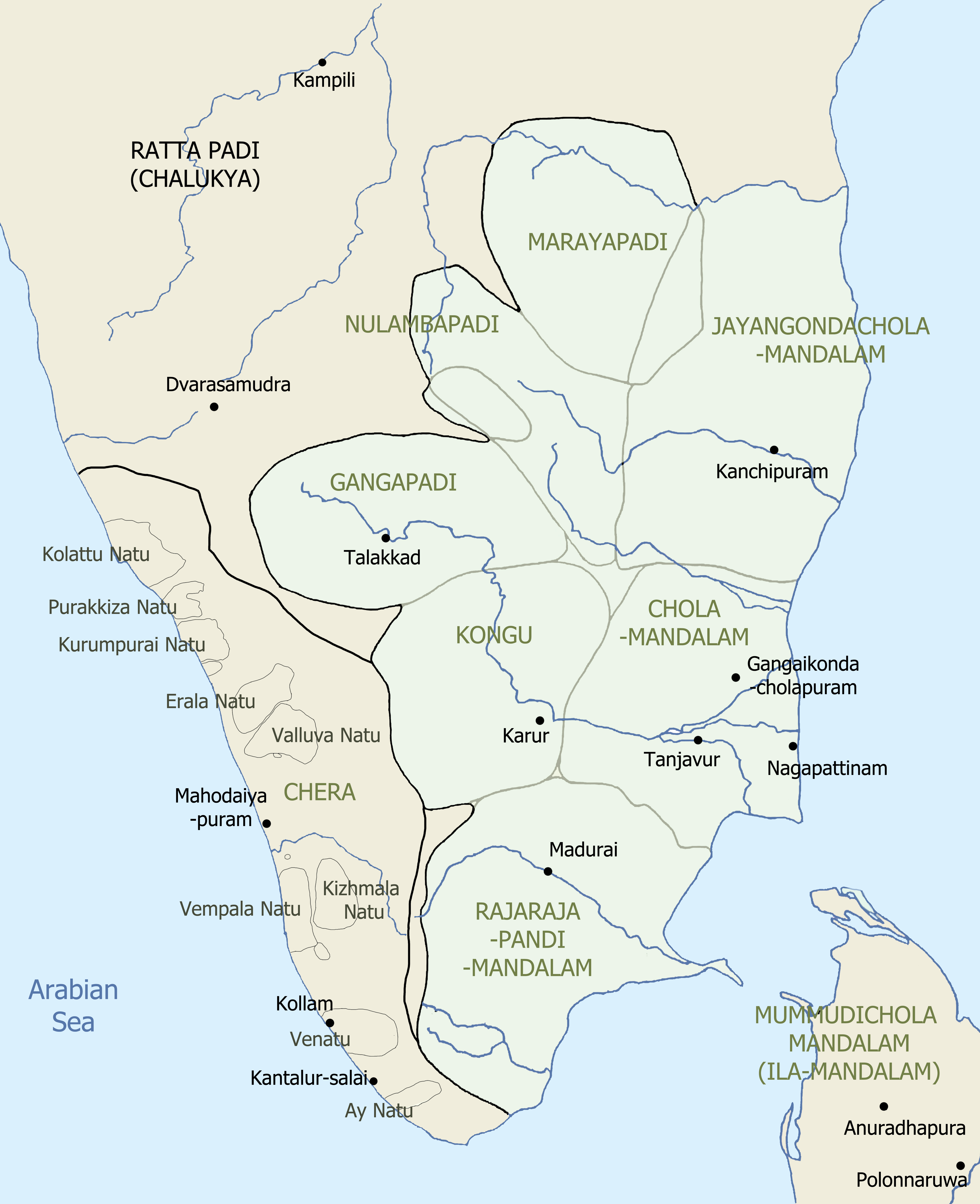
The mandalams of the Chola Empire, early 12th century CE

The Government of the Chola Empire was monarchical, similar to the Sangam age. The empire consisted of various kingdoms, vassals, chiefdoms and areas of influence owning alliance to the Emperor. Several of these vassalages had some degree of autonomy. Several historians have described the governmental system of the Cholas as a form of Feudalism. However, others including Burton Stein reject this due to differences between the governance of the Cholas and that of traditional feudalism in contemporary Europe.

The Chola Empire was divided into several provinces called mandalams which were further divided into valanadus, which were subdivided into units called kottams or kutrams. At local government level, every village was a self-governing unit. A number of villages constituted a larger entity known as a kurram, nadu or kottam, depending on the area. A number of kurrams constituted a valanadu. These structures underwent constant change and refinement throughout the Chola period.

Similar to other medieval Indian societies, the caste system played a role in Chola governance. According to Kathleen Gough, the Vellalars, the dominant aristocratic caste, provided taxes and tribute to the monarchy and military

Temples in the Chola era acted as both places of worship and centres of economic activity, benefiting the community. Some of the output of villages was given to temples, which reinvested some of the wealth accumulated as loans to the settlements.

Before the reign of Rajaraja I, huge parts of Chola territory were ruled by hereditary lords and local princes who were in a loose alliance with the Chola rulers. Thereafter, until the reign of Vikrama Chola in 1133, when Chola power was at its peak, these hereditary lords and local princes almost vanished from Chola records, and were either replaced with or became dependent officials, through whom the administration was improved and the Emperors were able to exercise closer control over the parts of the empire. The administrative structure expanded, particularly during and after the reign of Rajaraja. The government at this time had a multi-tiered, large, land-revenue department that was largely concerned with maintaining accounts. Corporate bodies such as the Ur, Nadu, Sabha, Nagaram, and sometimes local chieftains, undertook The assessment and collection of revenue, and passed the revenue to the centre. Rajaraja's reign initiated a massive project of land survey and assessment, and the empire was reorganised into units known as valanadus.

The executive officer first communicated the order of the King to the local authorities. Afterwards, the records of the transaction was drawn up and attested by witnesses, who were either local magnates or government officers.

In the Chola Empire, Justice was mostly a local matter; minor disputes were settled at village level. Minor crimes were punished with fines or a direction for the offender to donate to a charitable endowment. Even crimes such as manslaughter or murder were punished with fines. The king heard and decided crimes of the state, such as treason; the typical punishment in these cases was either execution or the confiscation of property.

=== Military ===
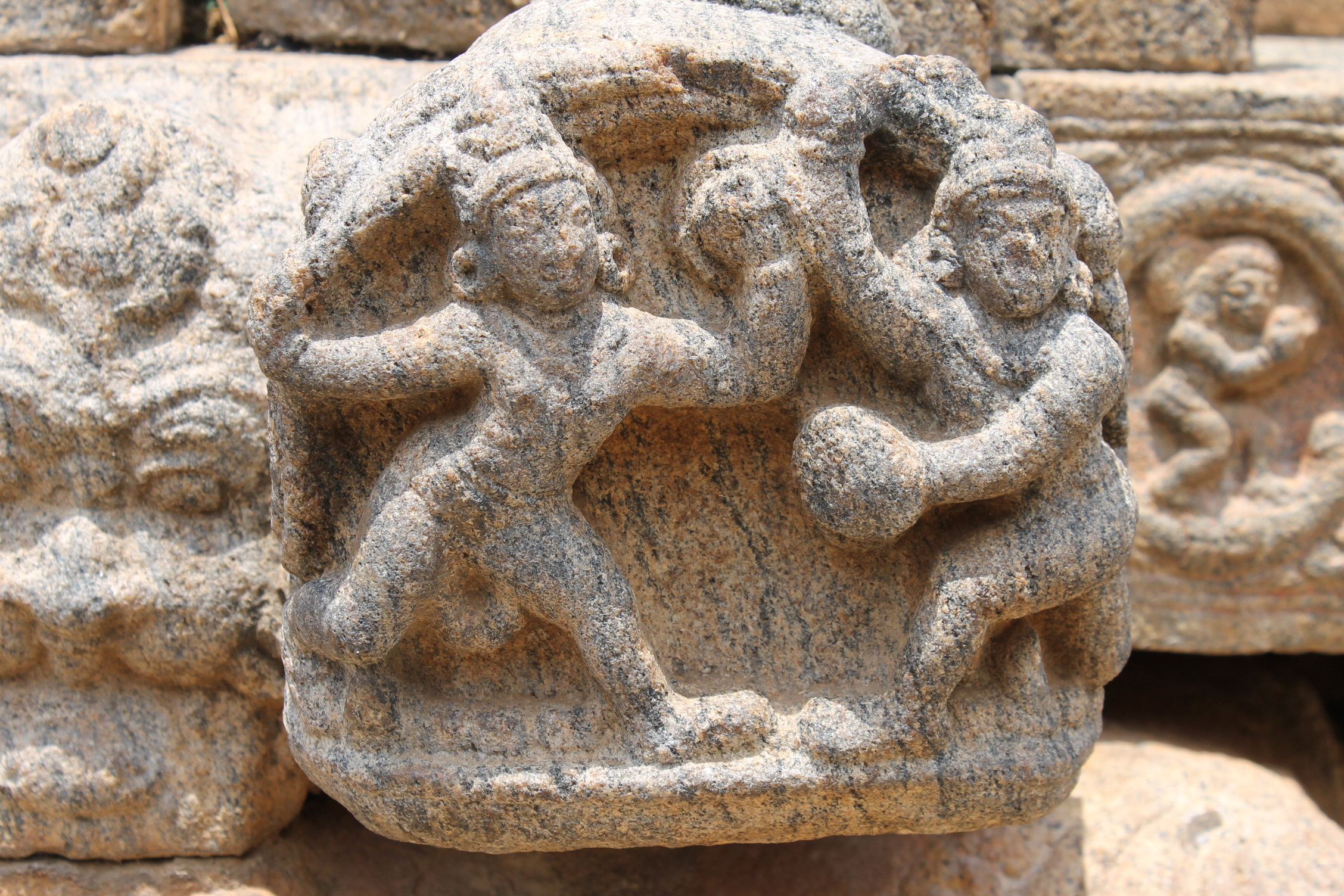
Chola Soldiers in battle at Airavatesvara Temple

The Chola military had four elements; the cavalry, the elephant corps, several divisions of infantry, and a navy. The Emperor was the supreme commander. There were regiments of bowmen and swordsmen, the latter of which were the most-permanent and most-dependable troops. The Chola army was spread all over the country and was stationed in local garrisons or military camps known as Kodagams. Elephants played a major role in the army; the empire had numerous war elephants that carried houses or huge howdahs on their backs. These howdahs were full of soldiers who shot arrows at long range and fought with spears at close quarters. The Chola army was mostly composed of Kaikolars—men with strong arms who were royal troops receiving regular payments from the treasury. (Note: Arul mozhideva-terinda-kaikola padai; in this, arulmozhideva is the king's name, terinda means well known, and padai means regime)

Chola rulers built several palaces and fortifications to protect their cities. The fortifications were mostly made of bricks but other materials like stone, wood, and mud were also used. According to the ancient Tamil text Silappadikaram, Tamil kings defended their forts with catapults that threw stones, huge cauldrons of boiling water or molten lead, and hooks, chains, and traps.

Chola soldiers used weapons such as swords, bows, javelins, spears, and steel shields. Several Chola weapons utilized Wootz steel.

The Chola navy was the zenith of ancient India sea power. It played a vital role in the expansion of the empire, including the conquest of the Sri Lanka islands and naval raids on Srivijaya. The navy grew both in size and status during the medieval Cholas reign. Chola admirals commanded much respect and prestige, and naval commanders also acted as diplomats in some instances. From 900 to 1100, the navy grew from a small entity to that of a potent power projection and diplomatic symbol in Asia, but was gradually reduced in significance when Cholas fought land battles to subjugate the Chalukyas of the Andhra-Kannada area in South India.

=== Economy ===
Land revenue and trade tax were the main source of income. Chola rulers issued coins in gold, silver, and copper. The Chola economy was based on three tiers; at the local level, agricultural settlements formed the foundation to commercial towns nagaram, which acted as redistribution centres for externally produced items bound for consumption in the local economy and as sources of products made by nagaram artisans for international trade. At the top of this economy were elite merchant groups (samayam) who organised and dominated the regions international maritime trade.

The Chola Empire's main export was cotton cloth. Uraiyur, the capital of the early Chola rulers, was a centre for cotton textiles Tamil poets praised. Chola rulers encouraged the weaving industry and derived revenue from it. During this period, weavers started to organise themselves into guilds. Weavers had their own residential sector in all towns; the most important weaving communities in early medieval times were the Saliyar and Kaikolar. During the Chola period, silk weaving attained a high degree of skill and Kanchipuram became one of the main centres for silk.

Metalcrafts peaked during the 10th to 11th centuries because Chola rulers like Chembian Maadevi extended their patronage to metal craftsmen. Wootz steel was a major Chola export. Farmers occupied one of the highest positions in society. These were the Vellalar community, who formed the nobility or the landed aristocracy of the country and were an economically powerful group. Agriculture was the principal occupation for many people besides landowners. The Vellalar community was the dominant secular aristocratic caste under the Chola rulers, providing the courtiers, most of the army officers, the lower ranks of the bureaucracy, and the upper ranks of the peasantry.

In almost all villages, the distinction between persons paying the land tax (iraikudigal) and those who did not was clearly established. There was a class of hired day-labourers who assisted in agricultural operations on estates of other people and received a daily wage. All cultivable land was held in one of the three broad classes of tenure; peasant proprietorship called vellan-vagai, service tenure, and eleemosynary tenure resulting from charitable gifts. The vellan-vagai were the ordinary ryotwari village of modern times, having direct relations with the government and paying a land-tax liable to periodic revision. The vellan-vagai villages fell into two broad classes; one directly paid a variable annual revenue to the state and the other paid fixed-rate dues to public institutions like temples to which they were assigned. The prosperity of an agricultural country depends to a large extent on the facilities provided for irrigation. Apart from sinking wells and excavating tanks, Chola rulers built large, stone dams across the Kaveri and other rivers, and cut channels to distribute water over large tracts of land. Rajendra Chola I dug near his capital an artificial lake that was filled with water from the Coleroon and the Vellar rivers.

An internal trade in several articles was carried out by organised mercantile corporations. The metal industries and the jewellers' art had reached a high degree of excellence. Sea salt was made under government supervision and control. Merchants organised into guilds that were described sometimes by the terms nanadesis; these were powerful, autonomous corporations of merchants that visited other countries in the course of trade. These corporations had mercenary armies for the protection of their merchandise. There were also local organisations of merchants called "nagaram" in big centres of trade like Kanchipuram and Mamallapuram.

=== Hospitals ===
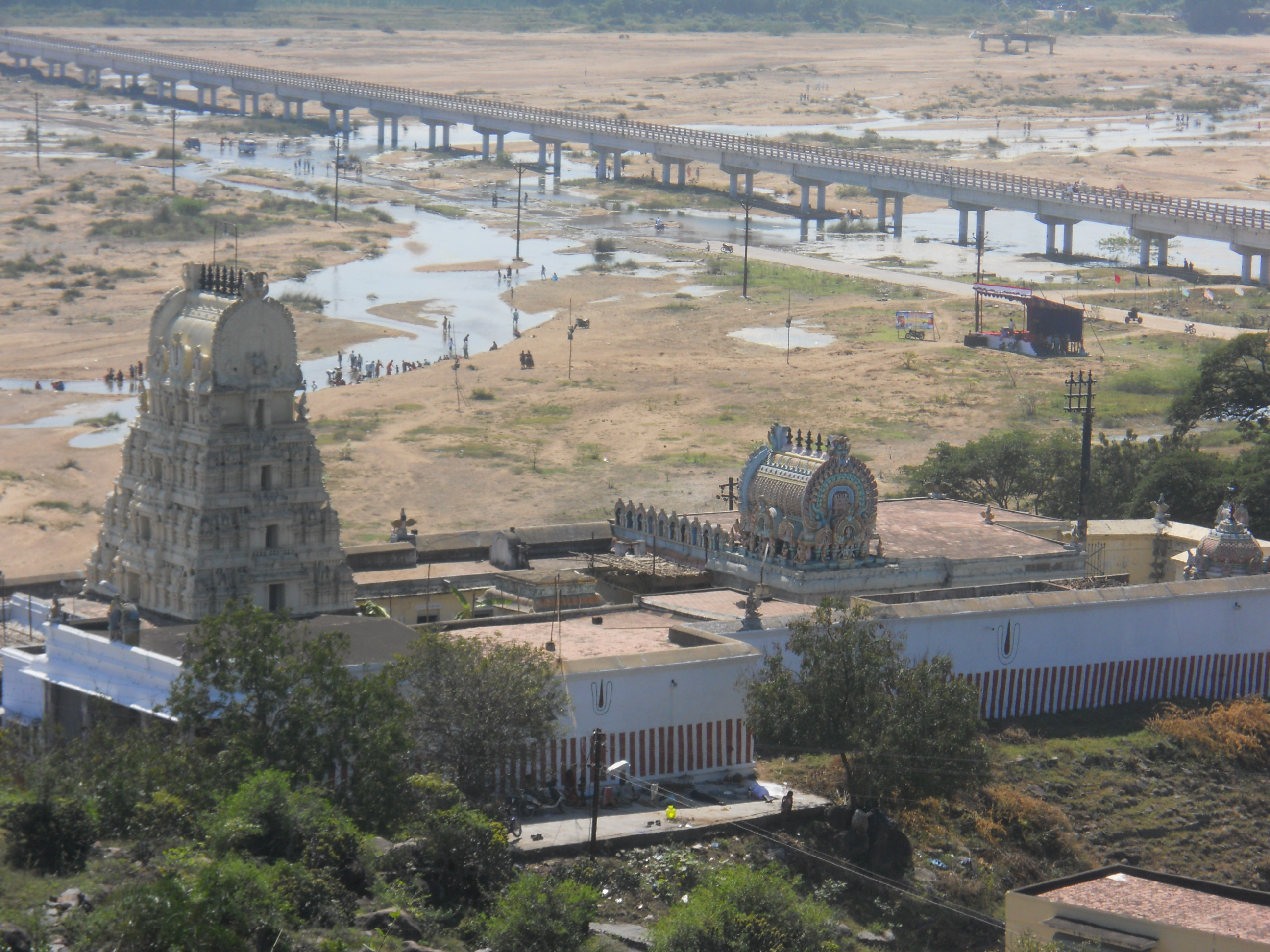
Aerial view of the Venkatesa Perumal Temple in Thirumukkudal (near Kanchipuram), a temple built by Virarajendra in 1069. The temple also included a hospital and Vedic schools.

Hospitals were maintained by the Chola kings, whose government gave lands for that purpose. The Tirumukkudal inscription shows a hospital was named after Virarajendra. Many diseases were cured by the doctors of the hospital, which was under the control of a chief physician, who was paid annually eighty kalams of paddy, eight kasus, and a grant of land. Apart from the doctors, other remunerated staff included a nurse, a barber who performed minor operations, and a waterman.

The Chola queen Kundavai established a hospital at Tanjavur and gave land for its perpetual maintenance.

=== Society ===
During the Chola period several guilds, communities, and castes emerged. The guild was one of the most significant institutions of south India and merchants organised themselves into guilds. The best known of these were the Manigramam and Ayyavole guilds though other guilds such as Anjuvannam and Valanjiyar were also in existence. Members of the Vellalar caste were sent to northern Sri Lanka by the Chola rulers as settlers. The Ulavar caste were agricultural workers and peasants were known as Kalamar.

The Kaikolar community were weavers and merchants who also maintained armies. During the Chola period, they had predominant trading and military roles. During the reign of the Imperial Chola rulers (10th–13th centuries), there were major changes in the temple administration and land ownership. There was more involvement of non-Brahmin peoples in temple administration. This can be attributed to the shift in financial power. Skilled classes like weavers and merchants had become prosperous. Land ownership was no longer a privilege of the Brahmins (priest caste) and the Vellalar land owners.

There is little information on the size and the density of the population during the Chola reign. The stability in the core Chola region enabled the people to lead a productive and contented life but there are reports of widespread famine caused by natural calamities.

The quality of the inscriptions of the regime indicates the inscribers had a high level of literacy and education. The text in these inscriptions was written by court poets and engraved by talented artisans. Education in the contemporary sense was not considered important; there is circumstantial evidence some village councils organised schools to teach the basics of reading and writing to children, although there is no evidence of systematic education system for the masses. Vocational education was through hereditary training, in which the father passed on his skills to his sons. Tamil was the medium of education for the masses; monasteries (matha or gatika) were centres of learning and received government support.

Under Chola kings, there was generally an emphasis on a fair justice system, and the kings were often described as sengol-valavan, the king who established just rule; and priests warned the king royal justice would ensure a happy future for him, and that injustice would lead to divine punishment.

=== Foreign trade ===
The Cholas, who were in possession of parts of the west and east coasts of peninsular India, engaged in foreign trade and maritime activity, extending their influence to China and Southeast Asia. Towards the end of the 9th century, southern India had developed extensive maritime and commercial activity. South Indian guilds played a major role in inter-regional and overseas trade. The best-known guilds were the Manigramam and Ayyavole, who followed the conquering Chola armies. The encouragement of the Chola court furthered the expansion of Tamil merchant associations and guilds into Southeast Asia and China. The Tang dynasty of China, the Srivijaya Empire under the Sailendras, and the Abbasid caliphate at Baghdad were the Chola Empire's main trading partners.

The Chola dynasty played a significant role in linking the markets of China to the rest of the world. The empire's market structure and economic policies were more conducive to a large-scale, cross-regional market trade than those enacted by the Chinese Song dynasty. A Chola record gives their rationale for engagement in foreign trade: "Make the merchants of distant foreign countries who import elephants and good horses attach to yourself by providing them with villages and decent dwellings in the city, by affording them daily audience, presents and allowing them profits. Then those articles will never go to your enemies."

Song dynasty reports record an embassy from Chulian (Chola) reached the Chinese court in 1077, and that the king of the Chulian at the time, Kulothunga I, was called Ti-hua-kia-lo. This embassy was a trading venture and was highly profitable to the Chola visitors, who returned with copper coins in exchange for articles of tribute, including glass and spices. The motive behind Rajendra's expedition to Srivijaya was probably the protection of the merchants' interests.

=== Canals and water tanks ===
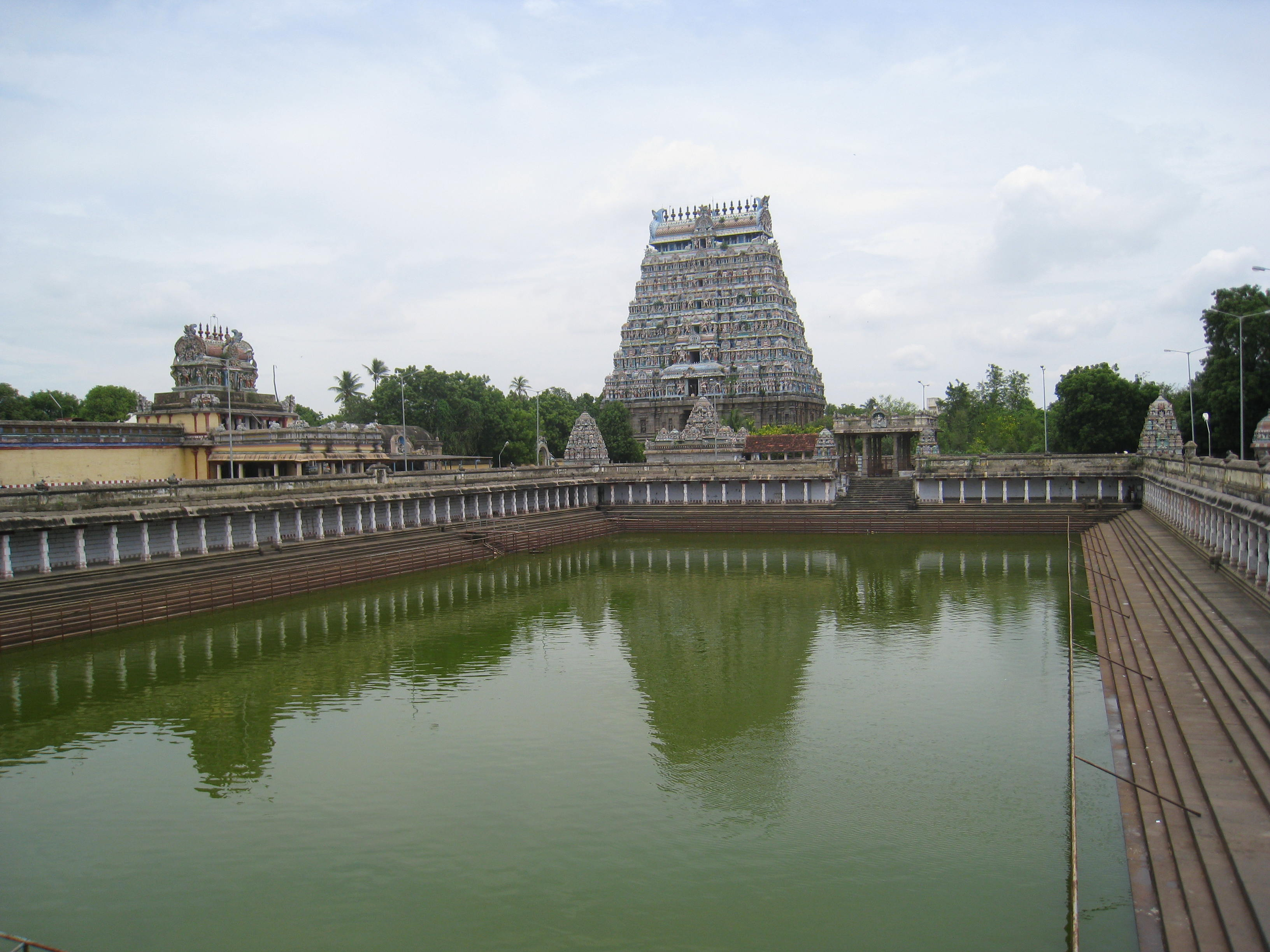
Water Tank of the Nataraja Temple in Chidambaram.

There was tremendous agrarian expansion during the rule of the imperial Chola dynasty (c. 900–1270) in present-day Tamil Nadu, particularly in the Kaveri Bassin. Canals of the Kaveri River were constructed in this period; these include the Uyyakondan canal, Rajendran vaykkal, and Sembian Mahadegvi vaykkal. There was an efficient, well-developed system of water management from the village level upwards. There was an increase in royal patronage, and the number of devadana and bramadeya lands, which increased the role of the temples and village assemblies in farming. Tank committees (eri-variyam) and garden committees (totta-variam) were as active as the temples with their vast resources in land, men and money. The water tanks that came up during the Chola period include one Rajendra Chola built at Cholagangam in his capital city Gangaikonda Cholapuram and was described as the liquid pillar of victory. Solagagam was about 16 miles (26 km) long, and was provided with sluices and canals for irrigating land in the neighbouring areas. Another very large lake of this period, which remains an important source of irrigation, is Viranameri near Kattumannarkoil in South Arcot district that Parantaka Chola founded. Other lakes of this period include Madurantakam, Sundra-cholapereri, and Kundavai-Pereri, which was named after a Chola queen).

== Art and architecture ==
=== Architecture ===
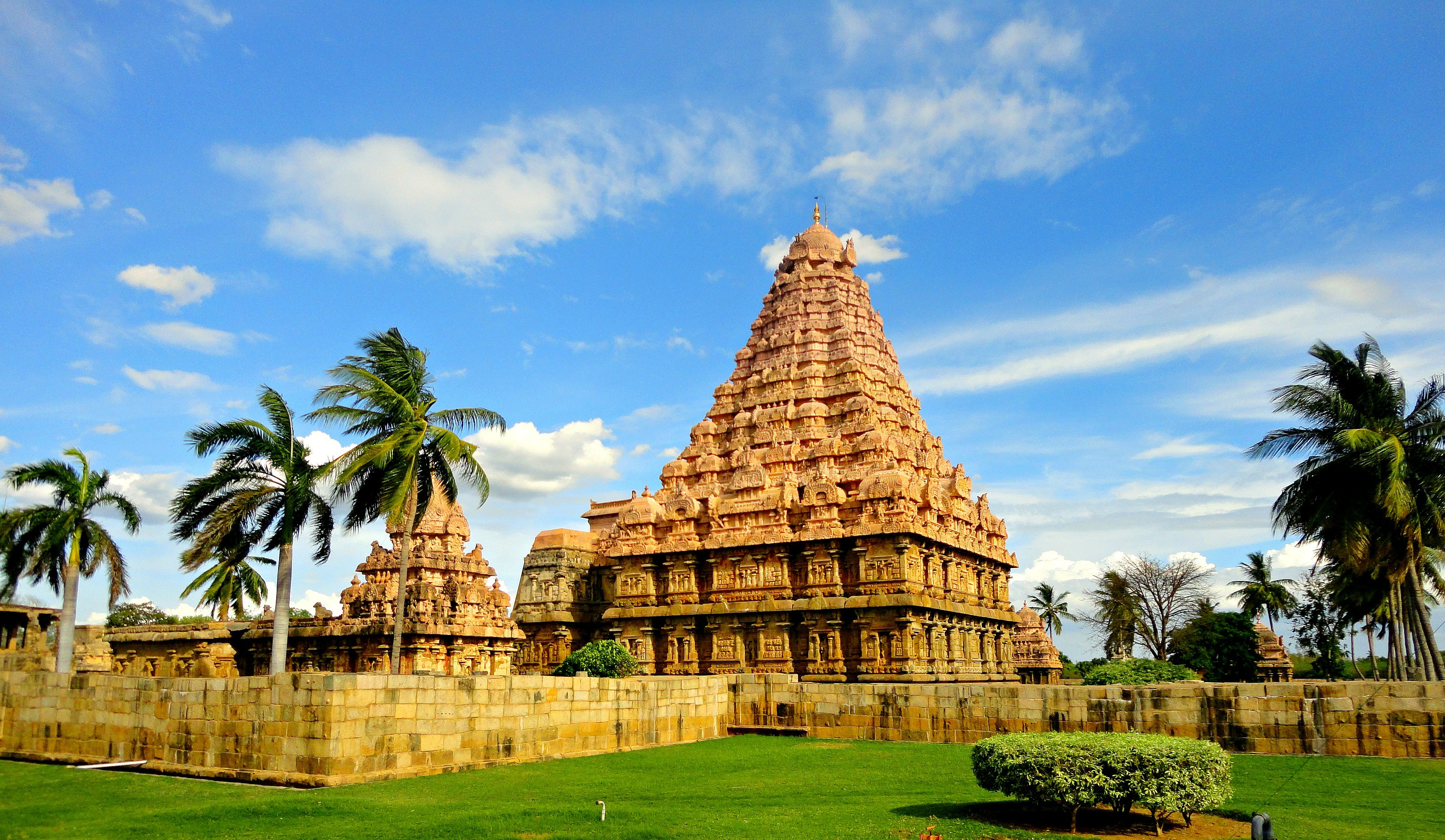
Gangaikonda Cholapuram, the capital of the Chola Empire, built from 1023 to 1027 by Rajendra I.

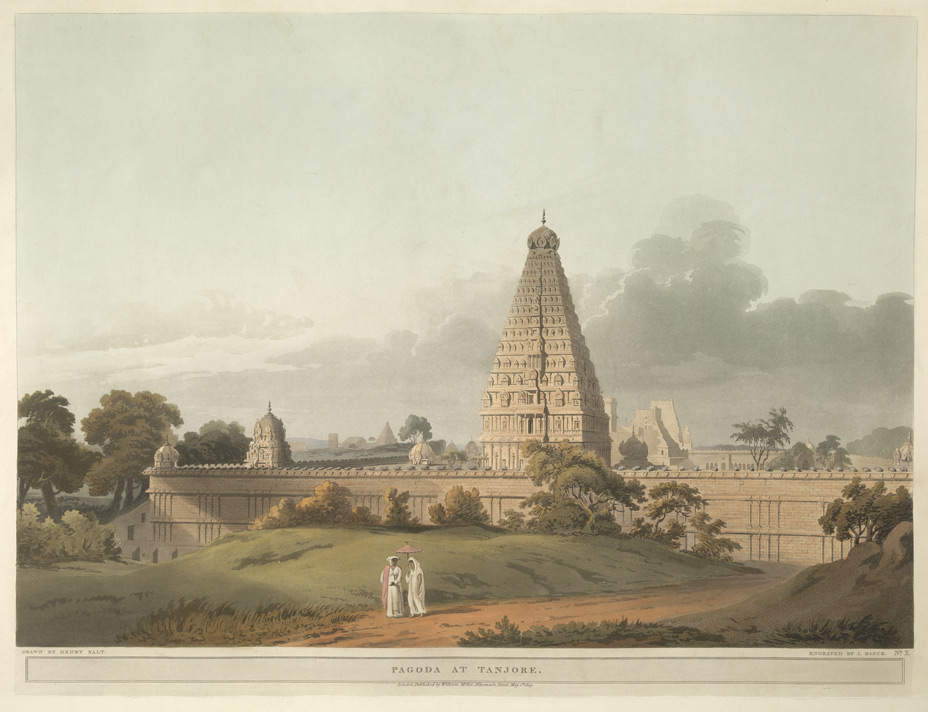
Brihadisvara Temple, built in 1010 by Rajaraja I

The Cholas continued the temple-building traditions of the Pallava dynasty and contributed significantly to the Dravidian temple design. They built a number of Shiva temples along the banks of the Kaveri River. The template for these and future temples was formulated by Aditya I and Parantaka. The Chola temple architecture has been appreciated for its magnificence and delicate workmanship, ostensibly following the rich traditions of the Pallava dynasty. Architectural historian James Fergusson says "the Chola artists conceived like giants and finished like jewelers". A new development in Chola art that characterised the Dravidian architecture in later times was the addition of a huge gateway called gopuram to the enclosure of the temple, which had been developed under the Pandya dynasty. The Chola school of art spread to Southeast Asia, and influenced the architecture and art of Southeast Asia.

Temple building received great impetus from the conquests and the genius of Rajaraja Chola and his son Rajendra Chola I. The temples at Thanjavur and Gangaikondacholapuram display the maturity and grandeur to which the Chola architecture had evolved. The Shiva temple of Thanjavur, which was completed around 1009, idisplays the material achievements of Rajaraja's reign, being the largest and tallest of all Indian temples of its time. The temple of Gangaikondacholisvaram at Gangaikondacholapuram, which was designed by Rajendra Chola, was intended to excel its predecessor. It was completed around 1030 in the same style. The greater elaboration in its appearance attests to the more affluent state of the Chola Empire under Rajendra. The Brihadisvara Temple, the temple of Gangaikondacholisvaram and the Airavatesvara Temple at Darasuram were declared World Heritage Sites by UNESCO, and are referred to as the Great Living Chola Temples.

The Chola period is also noted for its sculptures and bronzes. Specimens in museums around the world and in temples of South India include figures of Shiva in various forms, such as Vishnu and his consort Lakshmi, and the Shaivite saints. These works generally conform to the iconographic conventions established by long tradition but the sculptors of the 11th and the 12th centuries worked with great freedom to achieve a classic grace and grandeur. The best example of this can be seen in the form of Nataraja the Divine Dancer. (Note: By common consent, the finest Chola masterpieces are the bronze images of Siva Nataraja.)

=== Literature ===
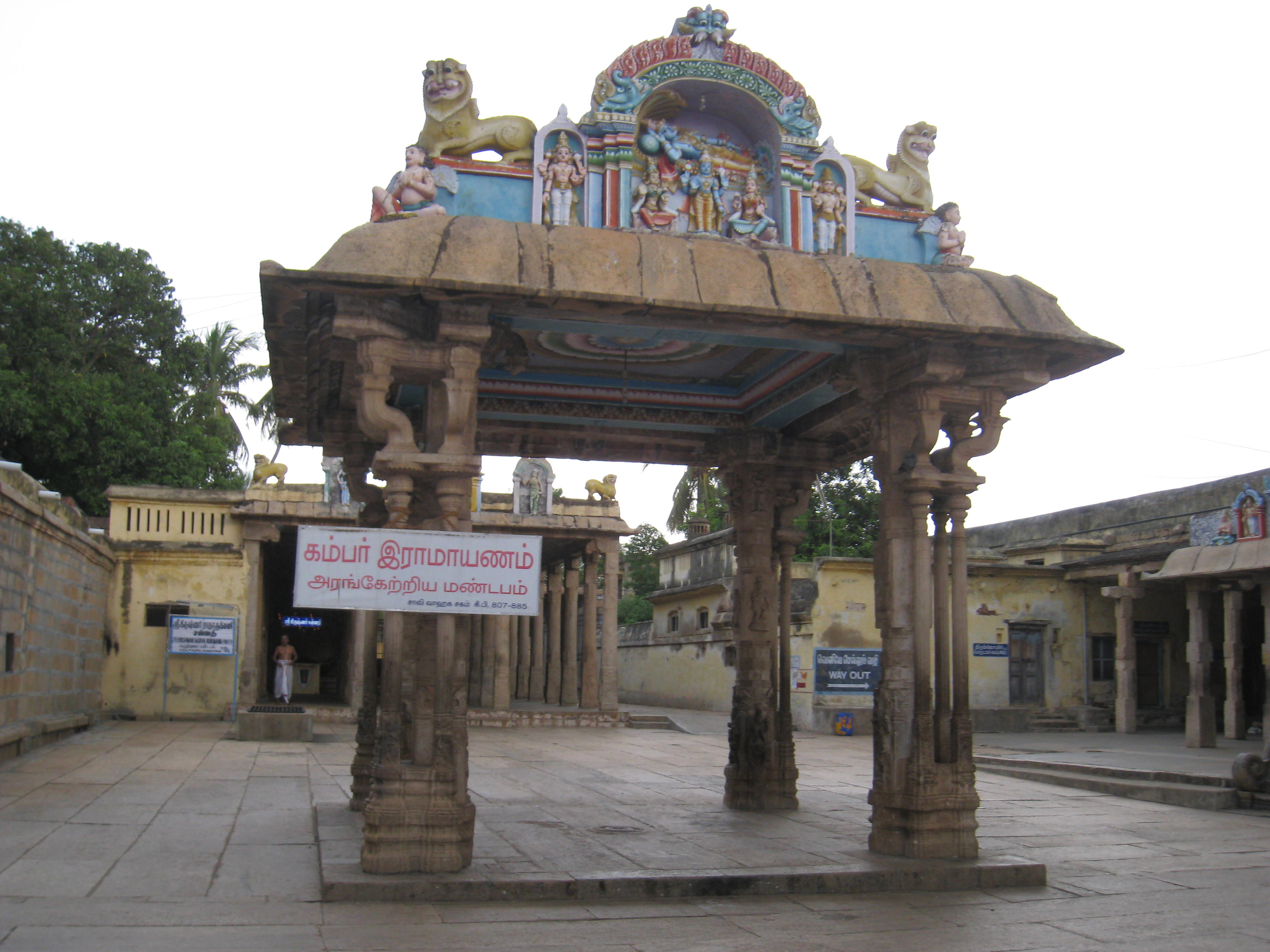
Kambar often recited poems at the Kamba Ramyanam Mandapam

Literature flourished in the Chola Empire. The poet Kambar was active during the reign of Kulothunga III. Kambar's epic poem Ramavataram (also referred to as Kambaramayanam) is a classic of Tamil literature; though the author states he followed Valmiki's Ramayana, it is generally accepted his work is not a simple translation or adaptation of the Sanskrit epic. Kambar's work describes the colour and landscape of his own time; his description of Kosala is an idealised account of the features of Chola country.

Jayamkondar's Kalingattuparani is an example of narrative poetry that draws a clear boundary between history and fictitious conventions. This poem describes events during Kulothunga's war in Kalinga, and depicts the pomp and circumstance of war, and the gruesome details of the field. The Tamil poet Ottakuttan was a contemporary of Kulottunga I and served at the courts of three of Kulothunga's successors. Ottakuttan wrote Kulothunga Cholan Ula, a poem extolling the virtues of the Chola king.

Nannul is a Chola-era work on Tamil grammar. It discusses all five branches of grammar and, according to Berthold Spuler, is still relevant and is one of the most-distinguished normative grammars of literary Tamil.

The Telugu Choda period was significant for the development of Telugu literature under the patronage of the rulers. In this era, great Telugu poets Tikkana, Ketana, Marana and Somana were active. Tikkana Somayaji wrote Nirvachanottara Ramayanamu and Andhra Mahabharatamu. Abhinava Dandi Ketana wrote Dasakumaracharitramu, Vijnaneswaramu, and Andhra Bhashabhushanamu. Marana wrote Markandeya Purana in Telugu. Somana wrote Basava Purana. Tikkana is one of the kavitrayam who translated Mahabharata into Telugu.

Of the period's devotional literature, the arrangement of the Shaivite canon into eleven books was the work of Nambi Andar Nambi, who lived close to the end of the 10th century. Relatively few Vaishnavite works were composed during the Later Chola period, possibly because of the rulers' apparent animosity towards them.

=== Religion ===
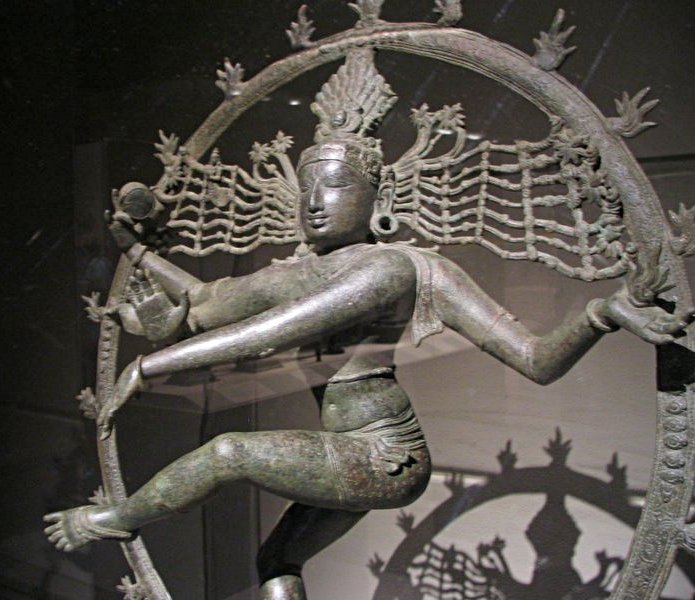
Bronze Chola Statue of Nataraja at the Metropolitan Museum of Art, New York City

In general, Cholas were followers of Hinduism. While the Cholas built their largest and most-important temple dedicated to Shiva, it is uncertain whether they were followers of Shaivism only or that they were not favourably disposed to other faiths. The second Chola king Aditya I (871–903) built temples for Shiva and Vishnu. Inscriptions of 890 refer to his contributions to the construction Ranganatha Temple at Srirangapatnam in the Western Gangas, who were both his feudatories and had connections by marriage with him. He also said the great temples of Shiva and Ranganatha temple were to be the Kuladhanam of the Chola emperors.

Parantaka II was a devotee of the reclining Vishnu (Vadivu Azhagiya Nambi) at Anbil the outskirts of Tiruchy, to whom he gave numerous gifts and embellishments. He prayed before Vishnu before his embarking on a war to regain territories in and around Kanchi and Arcot from the waning Rashtrakutas, and leading expeditions against Madurai and Ilam (Sri Lanka). Parantaka I and Parantaka Chola II endowed and built temples for Shiva and Vishnu. Rajaraja Chola I patronised Buddhists and provided for the construction of the Chudamani Vihara, a Buddhist monastery in Nagapattinam, at the request of Sri Chulamanivarman, the Srivijaya Sailendra king.

During the period of the Later Cholas, there were supposed instances of intolerance towards Vaishnavites especially towards their acharya Ramanuja. A Chola sovereign called Krimikanta Chola is said to have persecuted Ramanuja. Some scholars identify Kulothunga Chola II with Krimikanta Chola or worm-necked Chola, who is so-called because he is said to have suffered from cancer of the throat or neck. The latter finds mention in the vaishnava Guruparampara and is said to have been a strong opponent of the Vaishnavas. The 17th-century work Parpannamritam refers to a Chola king called Krimikanta who is said to have removed the Govindaraja idol from the Chidambaram Nataraja temple. According to temple records of the Srirangam temple, however, Kulottunga Chola II was the son of Krimikanta Chola. The former, unlike his father, is said to have been a repentant son who supported Vaishnavism.

Ramanuja is said to have made Kulottunga II a disciple of his nephew Dasarathi. The king then granted the management of Ranganathaswamy temple to Dasarathi and his descendants as per the wish of Ramanuja. Historian Nilakanta Sastri identifies Krimikanta Chola with Athirajendra Chola or Virarajendra Chola, with whom the main Vijayalaya Chola line ended. An inscription from 1160 states the custodians of Shiva temples who had social intercourse with Vaishnavites would forfeit their property. This is a direction to the Shaivite community by its religious heads rather than a diktat by a Chola emperor. While Chola kings built their largest temples for Shiva, and emperors like Rajaraja Chola I held titles like Sivapadasekharan, in none of their inscriptions did the Chola emperors proclaim their clan solely followed Shaivism or that Shaivism was the state religion during their rule.

== Family tree ==
Medieval Cholas

Vijayalaya; 848–881
Aditya I 871–907
Parantaka I 907–954
Rajaditya	Gandaraditya; 950–957	Arinjaya; 956–957
Uttama; 971–987	Parantaka II; 957–970
Aditya II	Raja Raja I 985–1014	Kundavai
Rajendra I 1012–1044
Rajadhiraja I 1018–1054	Rajendra II; 1051–1063	Virarajendra; 1063–1070
Athirajendra; 1067–1070

== Emperors ==
Ruler	Reign	Notes
Vijayalaya Chola	848–870	Founder of the Chola Empire and descendant of the Early Cholas.
Aditya I	870–907	
Parantaka I	907–955	
Gandaraditya	955–957	Ruled jointly.
Arinjaya	956–957	Ruled jointly.
Parantaka II	957–970	
Uttama	970–985	
Rajaraja I the Great	June/July 985 – January/February 1014 (Note: Crowned between 25 June and 12 July 985, and died in the month of Magha (month) in 1014)	
Rajendra I	1014–1044	
Rajadhiraja I	1044 – 28 May 1052	
Rajendra II	28 May 1052 – 1063	
Virarajendra	1063–1070	
Athirajendra	1070	Left no heirs.
Kulothunga I	9 June 1070 – 1122	Son of Amangai Devi Chola, daughter of Rajendra I, and Rajaraja Narendra, ruler of Eastern Chalukya dynasty. Kolothunga's reign started the period which was known as Chalukya-Chola dynasty or simply Later Cholas.
Vikrama	1122–1135	
Kulothunga II	1135–1150	Grandson of the previous.
Rajaraja II	1150–1173	
Rajadhiraja II	1173–1178	Grandson of king Virarajendra Chola.
Kulothunga III	1178–1216	
Rajaraja III	July 1216 – 1256	
Rajendra III	1256–1279	Last Chola ruler, defeated by the Maravarman Kulasekara Pandyan I of the Pandya dynasty. After the war, the remaining Chola royal bloods were reduced to the state of being chieftains by the Pandyan forces.

== Footnotes ==
Timeline and cultural period	Indus plain (Punjab-Sapta Sindhu-Gujarat)	Gangetic Plain			Central India	Southern India
Timeline and cultural period	Indus plain (Punjab-Sapta Sindhu-Gujarat)	Upper Gangetic Plain (Ganga-Yamuna doab)	Middle Gangetic Plain	Lower Gangetic Plain	Central India	Southern India
IRON AGE
Culture	Late Vedic Period	Late Vedic Period; Painted Grey Ware culture	Late Vedic Period; Northern Black Polished Ware		Pre-history	
6th century BCE	Gandhara	Kuru-Panchala	Magadha		Adivasi (tribes)	Assaka
Culture	Persian-Greek influences	"Second Urbanisation"; Rise of Shramana movements Jainism - Buddhism - Ājīvika - Yoga			Pre-history	
5th century BCE	(Persian conquests)		Shaishunaga dynasty		Adivasi (tribes)	Assaka
4th century BCE	(Greek conquests)	Nanda empire				
HISTORICAL AGE
Culture	Spread of Buddhism				Pre-history	
3rd century BCE	Maurya Empire					Satavahana dynasty Sangam period (300 BCE – 200 CE); Early Cholas; Early Pandyan kingdom Cheras
Culture	Preclassical Hinduism (Note: Michaels (2004) p.39) - "Hindu Synthesis" (Note: Hiltebeitel (2002)) (ca. 200 BCE - 300 CE) (Note: Michaels (2004) p.39) (Note: Hiltebeitel (2002)); Epics - Puranas - Ramayana - Mahabharata - Bhagavad Gita - Brahma Sutras - Smarta Tradition; Mahayana Buddhism					
2nd century BCE	Indo-Greek Kingdom		Shunga Empire; Maha-Meghavahana Dynasty			Satavahana dynasty Sangam period (300 BCE – 200 CE); Early Cholas; Early Pandyan kingdom Cheras
1st century BCE	Indo-Greek Kingdom		Shunga Empire; Maha-Meghavahana Dynasty			Satavahana dynasty Sangam period (300 BCE – 200 CE); Early Cholas; Early Pandyan kingdom Cheras
1st century CE	Indo-Scythians; Indo-Parthians		Kuninda Kingdom			Satavahana dynasty Sangam period (300 BCE – 200 CE); Early Cholas; Early Pandyan kingdom Cheras
2nd century	Kushan Empire					Satavahana dynasty Sangam period (300 BCE – 200 CE); Early Cholas; Early Pandyan kingdom Cheras
3rd century	Kushano-Sasanian Kingdom; Western Satraps	Kushan Empire		Kamarupa kingdom	Adivasi (tribes)	Satavahana dynasty Sangam period (300 BCE – 200 CE); Early Cholas; Early Pandyan kingdom Cheras
Culture	"Golden Age of Hinduism"(ca. CE 320-650) (Note: Michaels (2004) p.40); Puranas - Kural; Co-existence of Hinduism and Buddhism					
4th century	Kidarites	Gupta Empire; Varman dynasty				Andhra Ikshvakus; Kalabhra dynasty Kadamba Dynasty; Western Ganga Dynasty
5th century	Hephthalite Empire	Alchon Huns				Vishnukundina; Kalabhra dynasty
6th century	Nezak Huns; Kabul Shahi; Maitraka				Adivasi (tribes)	Vishnukundina; Badami Chalukyas; Kalabhra dynasty
Culture	Late-Classical Hinduism (ca. CE 650-1100) (Note: Michaels (2004) p.41); Advaita Vedanta - Tantra; Decline of Buddhism in India					
7th century	Indo-Sassanids		Vakataka dynasty Empire of Harsha	Mlechchha dynasty	Adivasi (tribes)	Badami Chalukyas; Eastern Chalukyas; Pandyan kingdom (revival); Pallava
7th century	Karkota dynasty				Adivasi (tribes)	
8th century	Kabul Shahi	Pala Empire			Adivasi (tribes)	Eastern Chalukyas; Pandyan kingdom Kalachuri
9th century	Gurjara-Pratihara				Adivasi (tribes)	Rashtrakuta Empire; Eastern Chalukyas; Pandyan kingdom Medieval Cholas; Chera Perumals of Makkotai
10th century	Ghaznavids			Pala dynasty Kamboja-Pala dynasty	Adivasi (tribes)	Kalyani Chalukyas; Eastern Chalukyas; Medieval Cholas; Chera Perumals of Makkotai; Rashtrakuta
References and sources for table References Sources: Flood, Gavin D. (1996), An Introduction to Hinduism, Cambridge University Press; Hiltebeitel, Alf (2002), Hinduism. In: Joseph Kitagawa, "The Religious Traditions of Asia: Religion, History, and Culture", Routledge; Michaels, Axel (2004), Hinduism. Past and present, Princeton, New Jersey: Princeton University Press
