= Kadava dynasty =

Tamil dynasty

Kadava was the name of a Tamil ruling dynasty who ruled parts of the Tamil country during the thirteenth and the fourteenth century. Kadavas were related to the Pallava dynasty and ruled from Kudalur near Cuddalore in Tamil Nadu. Hiranyavarman, the father of Nandivarman II Pallavamalla is said to have belonged to the Kadavakula in epigraphs. Nandivarman II himself is described as "one who was born to raise the prestige of the Kadava family". Chiefs bearing the Kadava title figure as feudatories of the Cholas as early as the 12th century. During the reign of Kulothunga Chola II, there was a vassal called Alappirandan Elisaimohan alias Kulottungasola Kadavaradittan. The Kadava kingdom was at the height of their power briefly during the reigns of Kopperunchinga I and Kopperunchinga II. These two rulers were powerful enough to challenge the waning Chola dynasty during the reign of Rajaraja Chola III and Rajendra Chola III. The two Kopperunchingas have left a large number of inscriptions mostly in the North and South Arcot districts and in the Chengalpattu district.

== Origins ==
The title Kadava is found among the several titles assumed by Mahendravarman I, Narasimhavarman I and Narasimhavarman II. The Kadava name with Kadavarayar is found in Tamil literature to refer to the Pallavas. The relationship of the Kadavas to the main Pallava dynasty is documented in an inscription in Kanchipuram. The kings of the collateral line of the Pallavas who were descended from Bhimavarman, the brother of Simhavishnu, are called the Kadavas. The Pallava king Nandivarman II (Pallavamalla) is praised as "one who was born to raise the prestige of the Kadava family."

Kadavarayar is one of the surnames of Kallar Caste. There are many araiyan titles, and brahmarayan, Pallavaraiyan, and vilupparayan, all often prefixed by a king's name, were titles given to officers by the king. Kadavarayan, chédirayan, and sambuvarayan, on the other hand, were titles held by some local chiefs as their family title.
