= Rajaraja III =

Chola emperor from 1216 to 1246

Rajaraja Chola III மூன்றாம் இராஜராஜ சோழன்
- Rajakesari
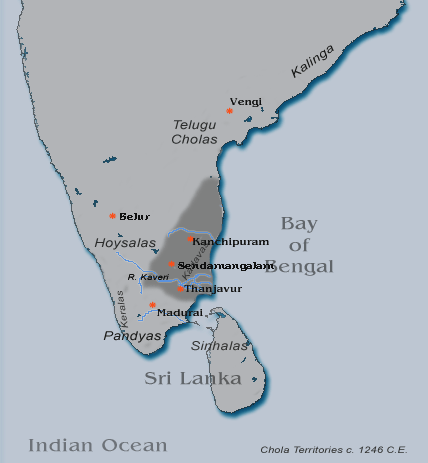
- Chola territories c. 1246

Chola Emperor
- Reign: July 1216–1246
- Predecessor: Kulothunga Chola III
- Successor: Rajendra Chola III
- Born: Unknown
- Died: 1260
- Queen: Koothadum Naachiyaar
- House: Cholas
- Dynasty: Chola

Rajaraja Chola III (died 1260) was the Chola emperor from 1216 to 1246. He succeeded Kulothunga Chola III on the Chola throne in July 1216. Rajaraja came to the throne of a kingdom much reduced in size as well as influence. With the rise of the Pandya power in the south, the Cholas had lost most of their control of the territories south of the river Kaveri and their hold on the Vengi territories in the north was slipping with the emergence of the Hoysala power.

== Period of political changes ==
The reign of Rajaraja III was a period of continuous trouble. It coincided with a period of great political changes in South India. Rajaraja was neither a great warrior nor a statesman to deal with the prevailing situation. The Pandyas in the south and the Hoysalas in the west had by now risen to the ranks of great powers led by rulers of exceptional merit. The only chance of survival for the Cholas was the rivalry between these new powers, neither of whom wanted the Cholas to come under the other's influence. The Chalukyas of Kalyani had given way for the rising power of the Seunas and the Andhra country around the Vengi territories were controlled by the Telugu Cholas.

=== Internal revolts ===
This was the signal the Chola feudatories and the overgrown vassals were waiting for in order to declare their independence. At the earliest opportunity that arose, they transferred their allegiance to either of the growing powers. Rajaraja Chola III came to power at this stage and he was the most incompetent king. His reign was characterised by growing revolt and conflicts even in nominally Chola territories. The Kadava chieftains of Kudalur were quick to take advantage of the growing weakness of their suzerain.

== Pandya invasion ==
Rajaraja was evidently not only weak, but incompetent. Pandyan inscriptions of the period state that he deliberately broke the terms of the treaty with his Pandyan overlord and refused to pay his tribute. This led to a punitive invasion by the Pandya forces. The Pandya army entered the Chola capital and Rajaraja took flight.

The Kadava Kopperunchinga I who had once been a Chola feudatory had begun to exercise their independence. Kopperunchinga wanted to gain some ground in the confused state of affairs. Muttiyampakkam is to be identified with the present village of Muttumbaka of the Gudur taluk ofNellore district, as has ... the Kadava chieftain Kopperunjinga who had imprisoned the Chola emperor Raja Raja-Ill (1216-1257 A. D.). He caught and imprisoned the fleeing Chola king at Sendamangalam.

=== Hoysala aid ===
The Cholas made alliances with the Hoysalas from the time of Kulothunga Chola III. Rajaraja III married a sister or a daughter of Vira Narasimha II. So when the Hoysala king Narasimha heard of the abduction of Rajaraja, and the subsequent devastation of the Chola country by Kopperunchinga's men, he immediately sent his army into the Chola country. The Hoysala army engaged Kopperunchinga's troops and sacked two of his towns. When the Hoysala army was preparing to lay siege to the Kadava capital of Sendamangalam, Kopperunchinga sued for peace and released the Chola king.

While his generals were attacking the Kadava chieftain Kopperunchinga, the Hoysala king Narasimha himself led his troops against the Pandya. A decisive battle took place between the Pandya and the Hoysala troops near Mahendramangalam on the banks of the river Kaveri and the Pandya army was defeated.

=== Conflict with the Hoysalas ===
Vira Narasimha II, a ruler of the Hoysala dynasty, is associated in some historical accounts with conflicts against Tikka I, a nellore Chola ruler and subordinate of Rajaraja III of the Chola dynasty. According to these accounts, a Hoysala ruler—identified with Narasimha II on chronological grounds—was defeated and killed during a campaign led by Tikka I around 1239–1240 CE. A Chola inscription from Jambai (dated to 1239 CE, in the 23rd regnal year of Rajaraja III) refers to a military expedition of Nayanar Gandagopala (Tikka I), and has been interpreted by some historians as indicating a victory in which a Hoysala ruler was slain.

== State of the Chola kingdom ==
For the rest of his reign Rajaraja had to depend heavily on Hoysala help. There was a continuous decrease in order within the kingdom and the disregard for the central control on the part of the feudatories increased. The extent of the kingdom over which Rajaraja had nominal control remained as during the times of Kulothunga III.

== Civil War and Succession ==
Rajendra Chola III who succeeded Rajaraja Chola III to the Chola throne in 1246 was his brother and subsequent rival. Although Rajaraja III was still alive, Rajendra began to take effective control over the administration. The epigraphs of Rajendra Chola III indicate a civil war between Rajaraja III and himself which came to end with the former killing the latter and ascending the throne. Rajendra's inscriptions laud him as the "cunning hero, who killed Rajaraja after making him wear the double crown for three years".

== Officials ==
Mallan Sivan alias Brahmadaraya muttaraiyan, referred to as pillai (son) was one of the officials of Rajaraja III. He was the holder of the royal fief (arasukuru) and the governor of Urattur-nadu.

== See also ==
Preceded by Kulothunga Chola III	Chola; 1216–1256 CE	Succeeded by Rajendra Chola III
