= Mandalam =

The mandalams of the Chola empire, c. 11th century.

A mandalam (maṇḍalam meaning circle; also known as pāḍi) was the largest territorial division during the Chola dynasty. At its height, the state was divided into nine mandalams which included areas in Sri Lanka and other conquered areas. The two core mandalams were Chola-mandalam and Jayangondachola-mandalam.

== Administrative divisions under the Cholas ==
The term mandalam had been in use as a designation of territory even during the Classical Age where it had been used to refer to the Chera, Chola, and Pandiya mandalams. Under Raja Raja Chola I, the concept was evolved to organise the various politico-cultural subregions of the Tamil country that had been unified under the Cholas. Each of these historically significant regions largely continued to maintain its own distinctive cultural characteristics as mandalams.

The mandalam was the largest of the Chola territorial divisions and was divided into smaller units named nāḍu). Each nadu functioned as an agrarian production unit and comprised around ten villages and possibly one or two towns (nagaram). Raja Raja Chola I introduced an intermediate division named vaḷanāḍu) to centralise the administration of the state. Chola-mandalam was divided into ten valanadus which, through bifurcation and rearrangement, increased to fifteen by early 12th century.

At the peak of their powers, the Chola country was divided into nine mandalams which included conquered regions such as Sri Lanka.

=== Cholamandalam ===
One of the core mandalams of the Cholas, Cholamandalam comprised the modern districts of Tanjavur, Tiruchirapalli, and South Arcot. The capitals at various points of Chola history are located here at Uraiyur, Tanjavur, and Gangaikondacholapuram.

=== Parkavan Mandalam ===
The Districts of Perambalur, Ariyalur, Salem, Attur, Kallakurichi, Part of Nammakal, Dharmapuri, Chidambaram, Villupuram, Cudalore, Trichy, Tanjore, Pudukottai, Sivagangai and Ramanathapuram are called Parkavan Mandalam.

=== Tondaimandalam / Jayankondacholamandalam ===
Tondaimandalam was another of the core mandalams of the Cholas and was previously a territory of the Pallavas. When it passed into the hands of the Cholas c. 880, it was renamed Jayankondacholamandalam (literally "the land victoriously absorbed into the Chola country"; also spelt Jayangondacholamandalam). Tondaimandalam broadly covers the modern districts of Chingleput, South Arcot, and North Arcot in Tamil Nadu and portions of Chittoor and Nellore districts in Andhra Pradesh. When under the control of the Pallavas between the fifth and ninth centuries, Kanchipuram was their capital.

=== Kongumandalam ===
Kongumandalam was a region bounded on all sides by hills and consisted of the present-day districts of Coimbatore, Nilgiri, Erode, Tiruppur, Karur, Krishnagiri, Dindigul, Salem, Namakkal, Dharmapuri and small parts of Tiruchirappalli(Thuraiyur taluk), Perambalur, Tirupathur (Kalrayan Hills), Palakkad district and Chamarajanagar district.

=== Pandyamandalam ===
Pandyamandalam or Rajarajapandimandalam was the land traditionally under the control of the Pandya dynasty. The region covered much of the southeastern portion of the Tamil country with its seat at Madurai.

=== Gangapadi ===
This mandalam was also known as Mudikondacholamandalam.

=== Tadigaipadi ===
This mandalam was also known as Vikramacholamandalam.

=== Nulambapadi ===
This mandalam was also known as Nigarilicholamandalam.

=== Marayapadi ===
Marayapadi was one of the northern mandalams and included parts of modern-day Andhra Pradesh and Telangana.

=== Mummudicholamandalam / Ilamandalam ===
When Raja Raja Chola I annexed the northern part of Sri Lanka, he named the area Mummudicholamandalam which was also known as Ilamandalam or Izhamandalam. Anuradhapura and Polonnaruwa were the major settlements in the region.

=== Naduvilmandalam ===
Not always considered a full-fledged mandalam, this region was called so as it lay between (naduvil) Cholamandalam and Tondaimandalam. The region was never associated with any particular ruling dynasty and consequently never gained in importance. Naduvilmandalam consisted of the area between the mouths of the South Pennar and North Vellaru rivers.

== See also ==
- Rajamandala
- Mandala (political model)
