= Battle of Tellaru =

Date	830
Location	near modern Vandavasi, Tamil Nadu
Result	Pallava victory

Belligerents
Pallava dynasty	Pandyan Dynasty

Commanders and leaders
Nandivarman III	Srimara Srivallabha

Strength
Unknown	Unknown

The Battle of Tellaru was fought in 830 between the forces of the Pallava King Nandivarman III and the Pandyan King Srimara Srivallabha. The Pandyan forces were defeated.
