= Rajendra III =

Chola emperor from 1246 to 1279

- KoParakesarivarman, Narapati
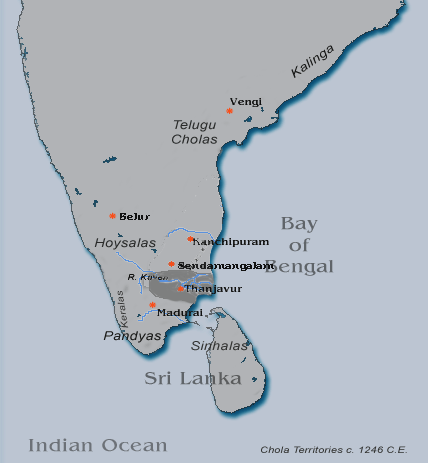
- Chola territories c. 1246

Chola Emperor
- Reign: 1246–1279
- Predecessor: Rajaraja Chola III
- Successor: Position disestablished (Maravarman Kulasekara Pandyan I as Pandya Emperor)
- Died: 1279
- Queen: Cholakulamadeviyar
- Issue: SeliyarKonar Semapillai Arasagandarama
- House: Cholas
- Dynasty: Chola
- Religion: Hinduism

Rajendra Chola III (reigned 1246–1279) was the last Chola emperor, who reigned from 1246 until his death in 1279. Rajendra began to take effective control over the administration, and epigraphs of Rajendra Chola III indicate there was civil war ending with the death of Rajaraja Chola III. Rajendra's inscriptions laud him as the "cunning hero, who killed Rajaraja after making him wear the double crown for three years".

== Northern expeditions ==
Rajendra Chola III took bold steps to revive the Chola fortunes. He led successful expeditions to the north as attested by his epigraphs found as far as Cuddappah.

== Initial success against the Pandyas ==
The king also defeated two Pandya princes, one of whom was Maravarman Sundara Pandyan II, and briefly made the Pandyas submit to the Chola overlordship. The Hoysalas, under Vira Someswara, sided with the Pandyas and repulsed the Cholas.

== Hostility with the Hoysalas ==
The Hoysalas played a divisive role in the politics of the Tamil country during this period. Exploiting the lack of unity among the Tamil kingdoms, they supported one Tamil kingdom against the other to prevent both the Cholas and Pandyas from rising to their full potential. During the period of Rajaraja III, the Hoysalas sided with the Cholas and defeated the Kadava chieftain Kopperunjinga and the Pandyas and established a presence in the Tamil country.

== Victory over the Hoysalas ==
During his reign, Rajendra Chola III undertook military campaigns against the Hoysala dynasty, who were significant political actors in southern India at the time. According to inscriptions, in the mid-13th century—around 1252 CE—Rajendra Chola III initiated hostilities against the Hoysala ruler Vira Someshwara. These campaigns appear to have been part of a broader effort to reassert Chola authority and counter regional rivals. Epigraphic evidence records that Rajendra Chola III achieved certain successes, including engagements that subdued opposing forces and symbolically asserted dominance over the Hoysala ruler. Some inscriptions describe the Chola king as having humbled Someshwara and celebrate his victories in conventional royal rhetoric. There are also references to conflicts involving allied or subordinate chiefs, suggesting that the warfare extended beyond a single decisive battle. However, the long-term impact of these victories appears to have been limited. Despite possible setbacks, the Hoysala position in the region does not seem to have been significantly weakened. Contemporary and later developments indicate that the balance of power in the Tamil region continued to shift, with the Pandya dynasty emerging as the dominant force in the later 13th century.

== War with Jatavarman Sundara Pandya ==
Jatavarman Sundara Pandya I ascended the Pandya throne in 1251. In the ensuing wars for supremacy, he emerged as the most victorious ruler and the Pandya kingdom reached its zenith in the 13th century during his reign. Jatavarman Sundara Pandya first put an end to Hoysala interference by expelling them from the Kaveri delta and subsequently killed their king Vira Someswara in 1262 AD near Srirangam. He then defeated Kopperunjinga, the Kadava chieftain, and turned him into a vassal. He then defeated Rajendra III and made him acknowledge the Pandya suzerainty. The Pandya then turned his attention to the north and annexed Kanchi by killing the Telugu Chola chief Vijaya Gandagopala of Nellore Cholas. He then marched up to Nellore and celebrated his victories there by doing the virabisheka(anointment of heroes) after defeating the Kakatiya ruler, Ganapati. Meanwhile, his lieutenant Vira Pandya defeated the king of Lanka and obtained the submission of the island nation.

== Aftermath the Pandya war ==
There are no confirmed reports of Rajendra Chola III having been killed in the battle so he lived in obscurity in Pazhayarai up to 1279, after which there are no inscriptions found of the Cholas. This war marks the end of Cholas reign in Tamil Nadu and the Chola territories were completely absorbed by the Pandyan empire.

== Fate of Cholas ==
After the war, the remaining Chola royal bloods were ceased to exist by the Pandyan forces as a retribution for the enslaving the Pandyans for three centuries in their capital city Madurai. One such branch was the Chola/Cholaganar chiefs of Pichavaram. The Pandyas who were vassals of the Vijayanagar Empire wasted no time and appealed to Krishnadevaraya. The latter then sent his general Nagama Nayak who defeated the Chola but then usurped the throne of Madurai instead of restoring the Pandyas.

== Notes ==
- Nilakanta Sastri, K. A. (1935). The CōĻas, University of Madras, Madras (Reprinted 1984).
- Nilakanta Sastri, K. A. (1955). A History of South India, OUP, New Delhi (Reprinted 2002).

Preceded by Rajaraja Chola III	Chola; 1246–1280 CE	Succeeded by Jatavarman Sundara Pandyan
