= List of Telugu chodas =

Rulers of Andhra Pradesh, 6th-13th century

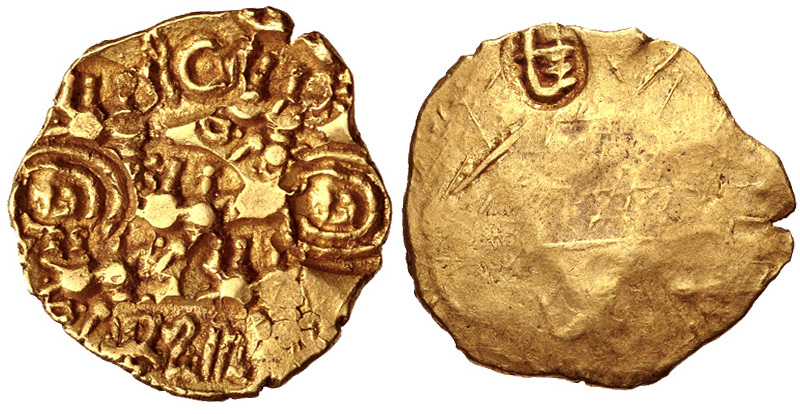
Coinage of the Chodas of Nellore. King Bhoja II, 1216-1316 CE. Uniface flank with central lion standing left, four additional lions, two śris, uncertain marks, and bhujabha legend in Telugu punchmarks

South Asian polities, c. 1250 CE.

The Telugu Chodas or Telugu Cholas were rulers who ruled parts of present-day Andhra Pradesh, Telangana and southern Odisha as Independent rulers at different times, but mainly as samantas (vassals) of the Pallavas, and later as vassals of the Imperial Cholas. There are many branches like Renati Chodas, Pottapi Chodas, Velanati Chodas, Konidena Chodas, Nannuru Chodas, Nellore Chodas and Kunduru Chodas. The Telugu Chodas claimed descent from Sangam age Tamil king Karikala Chola.

== Language and legacy ==
Renati Choda kingdom is mentioned by a Chinese traveller Yuan Chwang in the seventh century A.D.

The Telugu Chodas contributed much to the early development and evolution of Telugu language and were the first dynasties to use Telugu as their official language in Andhra region. The oldest long Telugu inscription found so far is Kalamalla inscription dating to 575 CE put up by Renati Choda king Erikal Mutturaju Dhanunjaya. However, there exist several Telugu label inscriptions dating back to the 2nd century BCE.

== Renati Chodas ==
The Telugu Chodas of Renadu, also called Renati Cholas are a Telugu dynasty , ruled over the Renadu region, during 6th-8th centuries from the present-day Kadapa district. The family seems to have had its origin in Erikal in the Kadapa district. They were independent sometime, but mostly they were forced to suzerainty of the Pallavas.

The earliest of this family was Nandivarman (500 CE) who claimed descent from the family of Karikala and the Kashyapa Gotra. He had three sons, Simhavishnu, Sundarananda and Dhanunjaya, all of whom were ruling different territories simultaneously. Dhanunjaya is described as Erikal-Mutturaju and as ruling Renadu.

In the first half of the seventh century, Punyakumara, a descendant of Dhanunjaya, ruled over Renadu and Hiranyarashtra. He too bears the title Erikal-Mutturaju.

They used the Telugu language in their inscriptions of the sixth and eighth centuries. Such inscriptions have been found near Muddanur, and at Gandikota, Jammalamadugu and Proddatur. In the Malepadu plates (seventh century), Renati Chola king Punyakumara stated that they belong to the family of Sangam age Chola king Karikala Chola.

Renati Chodas:

- Nandivarman
- Simhavishnu, Sundarananda and Dhanunjayavarman
- Mahendravikramavarma
- Gunamudita and Punyakumara
- Vikramaditya Choda Maharajadhiraja I
- Saktikumara
- Vikramaditya Choda Maharajadhiraja II
- Uttamaditya and Satyaditya

== Pottapi Chodas ==
Telugu Chodas of Pottapi are a branch of Renati Chodas and ruled the Cuddapah region after the fall of the latter. They had Pottapi as their capital. Pottapi lay on the northern fringe of Tondaimandalam and it embraced the bulk of Venkatagiri, Gudur, Chandragiri and Srikalahasti taluks of Tirupati district and Rajampet taluk of Annamayya district. According to some of the village records found in Andhra, Karikala Choda built many villages in Southern Andhra when he captured it from Trilochana Pallava. One of the villages is Pottapi. Pottapi became the most important village and hence the locality in the course of time acquired the name Pottapi Nadu. The early history of the Pottapi Chodas is obscure, and the circumstances leading to their acquisition of Pottapi are not known. Consequent on their downfall at the hands of the major powers like the Rashtrakutas and the minor powers like the Vaidumbas, the Renati Chodas appear to have sunk into oblivion for a short period. It is likely that some members of Renati Choda family moved eastwards and finding an opportunity established themselves as the rulers of Pottapi-nadu. A Pottapi Choda king named Srikantha Chola was ruling Tondai Nadu according to Dalavaypuram copper plates of Pandya king Parantaka Viranarayana. In Madras Museum copper plates, this Srikantha claims descendant from Tamil king Karikala Chola through Sundarananda of Renati Chodas. The Anbil plates of Parantaka Chola II and Velanjeri plates of Parantaka Chola I mention the name Sri Kantha whose name precedes that of Vijayalaya Chola, however, it is unknown if both individuals are the same and share any relations between. The term Pottapi Choda is associated as a title with many of the chiefs of this family as for example Madhurantaka Pottapi Choda Ghattiyarasa and Madhurantaka Pottapi Choda Vimaladitya. Pottapi Chodas use the Charana Saroruha prasasti in their inscriptions.

Pottapi Chodas:

- Srikantha Choda
- Dasavarma
- Vankēya Choda
- Balliya Choda Maharaju
- Mudigonda Choda Maharaju
- Bijjana
- Mallideva I
- Mallideva IV
- Opili Siddhi II
- Mahamandalesvara Ghattideva Maharaju alias Ghattiyarasa
- Bettarasa
- Siddharasa and Vimaladitya
- Somesvara and Mallideva

== Velanati Chodas ==
Velanati Chodas
Durjaya Chieftains of Velanadu
- Gonka I: 1076–1108
- Rajendra Choda I: 1108–1132
- Gonka II: 1132–1161
- Rajendra Choda II: 1161–1181
- Gonka III: 1181–1186
- Pruthviswara: 1186–1207
- Rajendra Choda III: 1207–1216

Telugu Chodas of Velanadu (Velanati Chola) were one of the Telugu Choda families. Velanadu is located in the modern Guntur district. The chieftains who ruled over Velanadu came to be known as the Velanati Chodas. One of them, Rajendra Choda II had even assumed the title Durjayakulaprakasa since Velanati Chodas claims descendant from Durjaya, legendary Andhra chieftain and a descendant of Karikala Chola. These Velanati chiefs were the subordinate allies of the Later Cholas of the south. They were entrusted with the responsibility of the governance of the Andhra region, which formed a part of the Chola kingdom in the between the tenth and early decades of the thirteenth century. Their capital was Dhanadapura (Dhannada) or Sanaduprolu, the modern Chandolu in the Guntur district initially then later they ruled from Vengi in West Godavari and Pithpuram in East Godavari Districts. Dhannada is also the site of the war between the Cholas and the Later Chalukyas when the Western Chalukya king Satyashraya invaded the Eastern Chalukyas, which was swiftly repulsed by the forces of Rajendra Chola I who helped the Eastern Chalukyas and the Velanadu Chodas with whom the Cholas had marital ties.

The Velanati Chiefs rose to prominence among the vassals of the Chalukyas of Vengi during the early days of Kulothunga Chola I and served as the later viceroys faithfully as their trusted lieutenants and generals. Finding his dominion dwindling, due to the ascendancy of the Kalyani Chalukyas in the Vengi country, Kulothunga Chola lent support to his loyal chieftains of Velanadu to bring the situation under control and rule over Vengi as his vassals. Evidence is available to the effect that five chieftains of Velanadu ruled over the country after which it was overrun by the Kakatiyas and became a part of their kingdom.

Velanati Chodas:

- Gonka I (1076–1108 )
- Rajendra Choda I (1108–1132 )
- Gonka II (1132–1161 )
- Rajendra Choda II (1161–1181 )
- Gonka III (1181–1186 )
- Pruthviswara (1186–1207 )

== Konidena Chodas ==
They ruled Kammanadu from 950 to 1300 A.D., which is now part of the Guntur district, for about two centuries, with Konidena (also called as Kotyadona) near Narasaraopeta serving as the capital.

The Konidena Chodas were a branch of the Pottapi Chodas. They claimed descent from Dasavarma of Pottapi Chodas who was ruling Renadu country with Pottapi as capital. They also ruled over parts of Palanadu in 11th and 12th centuries. A branch of Pottapi Chodas moved northwards and started ruling with Konidena as capital. Early kings Kannara Choda and Kama Choda were independent. Tribhuvana Malla Choda, son of Kama Choda, was a chieftain to Gonka II of Velanati Chodas. Nanni Choda, son of Tribhuvana Malla Choda declared independence again, but was soon defeated and forced to be vassals again by Gonka II. After the fall of Velanadu Chodas, they were forced to suzerainty by Ganapatideva of Kakatiyas. They claimed descent from the Karikala Chola and used the title Lord of the city of Urayur.

Konidena Chodas:

- Balli Choda
- Nanni Choda I
- Pottapi Kamadeva
- Kannara Choda
- Kama Choda and Tribhuvana Malla Choda
- Nanni Choda II
- Kama Choda
- Balli Choda

== Nannuru Chodas ==
Nannuru Chodas were another branch of Telugu Chodas in the region of Pakanadu. The famous Telugu poet Kaviraja Sikhamani Nanne Choda belonged to this family. Not much is known of this clan and it is believed to have been a subordinate of Vikramaditya VI of Kalyani Chalukyas.

== Nellore Chodas ==
Nellore Chodas was the most predominant Chola branch who ruled south Andhra from 1100 to 1350 A.D. Throughout a reign spanning more than two centuries, twelve members of the lineage ruled over much of Andhra region, with occasional overstretching into the Hoysala and Imperial Chola kingdoms. In general, the Cholas emperors in the early periods and the Kakatiyas in the latter periods held superiority over the Nellore Cholas. But for all intents and purposes, they were effectively independent. As the Velanandu era came to an end, the Cholas's influence grew, and they played a major role in South India's political development throughout the thirteenth century A.D. They claim descent from Karikala Chola.

Nellore Chodas:

- Bijjana
- Manumasiddharasa I
- Dayabhima and Nallasiddharasa
- Errasiddha
- Manumasiddharasa II
- Tammusiddhi
- Tikka Choda I or Thirukalatti
- Allutikka, Manumasiddharasa III and Vijayagandagopala
- Tikka Choda II
- Manumagandagopala or Nallasiddharasa III
- Rajagandagopala or Ranganatha
- Viragandagopala

== Kunduru Chodas ==
Kunduru Cholas ruled with its capitals in Vardhamanapura, Penugal, and Kanduru of Telangana region from 1080 - 1260 A.D.. They ruled Mahboobnagar, Nalgonda and Krishna districts as their kingdom. They owed loyalty to Western Chalukyas and Kakatiyas. Their history also recorded in Kakatiya inscriptions. These kings are described that they belonged to Karikala Chola family.

Kunduru Chodas:

- Eruva Bhima Choda I
- Tondaya I
- Bhima Choda II
- Tondaya II
- Mallikarjuna Choda
- Bhimarasa
- Gokarna Choda I
- Sridevi Tondaya
- Udayaditya Choda II
- Bhima Choda IV
- Udayaditya Choda III
- Gokarna Choda II

== Eruva Cholas ==
From roughly the start of the 1120-1330 A.D, a Chola family ruled over Eruvanadu, also known as "Eruvadesa." These Cholas added Eruva as a prefix to their names. Apart from the Eruva chola dynasty that governed the area around Rajahmundry during the middle of the 14th century A.D., there are more than six Eruva cholas that are known to exist. According to their increption they used titles call him the lord of Urayur and of the lineage of Karikala Chola.

== Unknown branches ==
Different branches of Chola chiefs ruled over the Andhra Pradesh districts of Kurnool and Anantapur. Despite the fact that the beginning and end of the Chola dynasty are still unknown, all of the emperors claimed to be descended from Karikala Chola. The different Chola chiefs who governed these areas were as follows, Kandur Tondarasa Chola Maharaja presided over Kollipa, Bijjana Chola Maharaja ruled over Kanne, Pedakal-300, and Naravadi, and Mahamandalesvara Ballaya ruled over Sindavadi and Kanne Chola. Likewise, these regions were dominated by Kondaya Chola Maharaja, Udayaditya Chola Maharaja, and Chidanna Chola Maharaja.

== Sources ==
- Sastri, K.A. Nilakanta (1975). A history of south India : from prehistoric times to the fall of Vijayanagar (4 ed.). Oxford: Oxford Univ. Press. ISBN 9780195606867.
- Durga Prasad, History of the Andhras up to 1565 A. D., P. G. PUBLISHERS, GUNTUR (1988)
- K.R. Subramanian, Buddhist Remains in Andhra and the History of Andhra
- Etukuri Balarama murthi, Andhrula Samkshiptha Charithra
- Paula Richman, Questioning Ramayana: A South Asian Tradition
