= Tondaimandalam =

Historical region in India

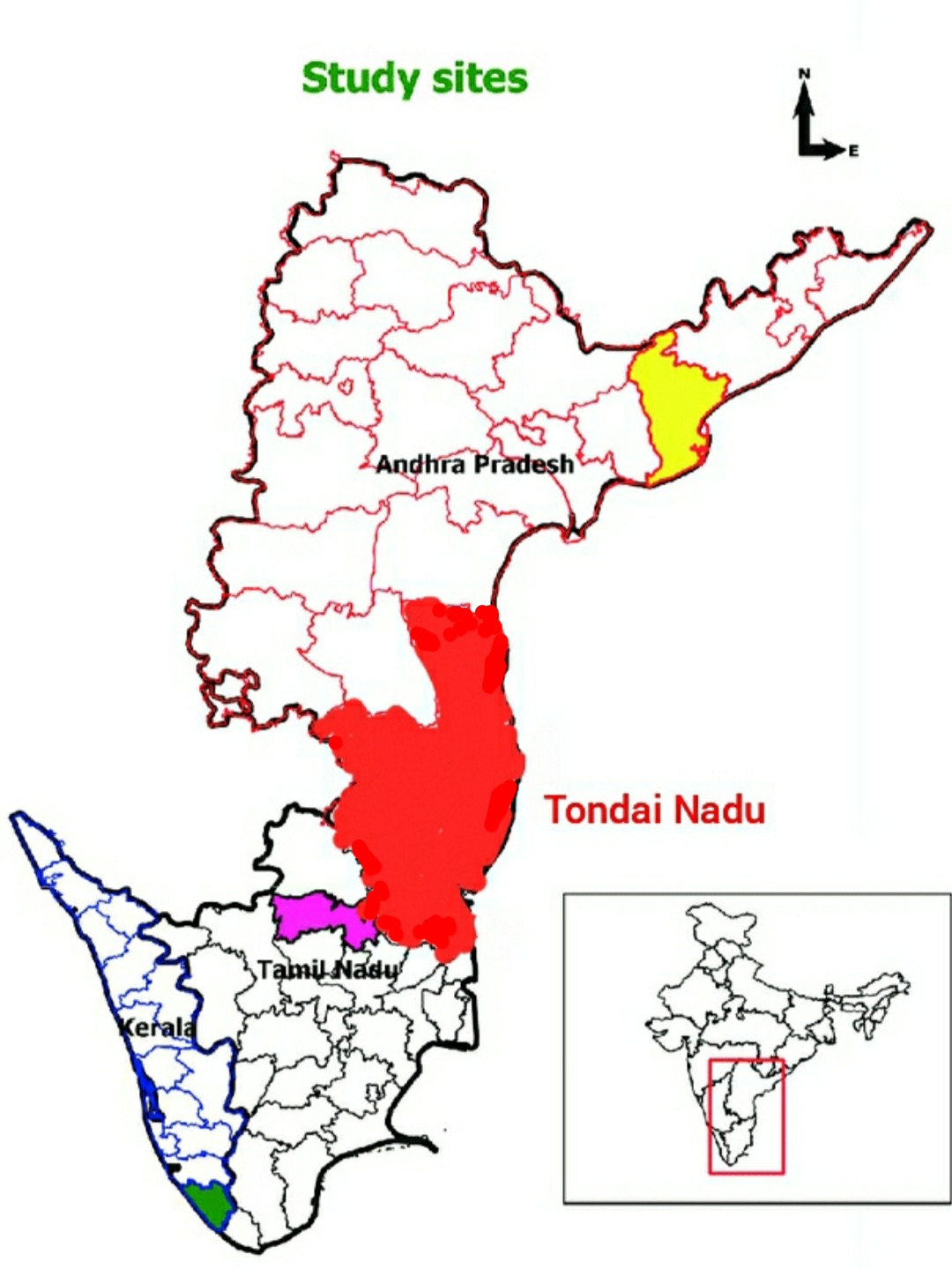
Tondaimandalam region (red color) comprising Nellore, Chittoor, Tirupati, Annamayya, Vellore, Ranipet, Tirupattur, Tiruvannamalai, Villupuram, Tiruvallur, Chengalpattu, and Chennai districts of modern-day Andhra Pradesh and Tamil Nadu.

Toṇḍaimaṇḍalam, also known as Toṇḍai Nāḍu, is a historical region located in the northernmost part of Tamil Nadu and southernmost part of Andhra Pradesh. Toṇḍaimaṇḍalam was divided into 24 kottams — smaller districts by kurumbar king and also build a royal fort (pulhal). The kottams are subdivided into smaller agricultural districts called nadus, which were groupings of several agricultural villages. At the beginning of the historical period, the kottams were mostly pastoral. The region comprises the districts which formed a part of the legendary kingdom of Athondai Chakravarti. The boundaries of Tondaimandalam are ambiguous – between the river basins of Penna River and Ponnaiyar River. During the reign of Rajaraja I, this region was called as Jayankonda Cholamandalam.

== Geography ==
The exact borders to the region of Toṇḍaimaṇḍalam are not defined and was probably different during different historical periods. In general, the region of Toṇḍaimaṇḍalam comprised the drainage basins of three main river systems: the Arani in the north, the Kosasthalaiyar in the middle, and the Palar-Cheyyar-Veghavati system in the south. The northern border of Toṇḍaimaṇḍalam was roughly around Pulicat Lake, while its southern border was somewhere north of the Peṇṇai river.

Toṇḍaimaṇḍalam also included the Perumbāṇappāḍi chieftaincy in the northwest. South of Perumbāṇappāḍi, a portion of the region known as Pangaḷanaḍu was also included as part of Toṇḍaimaṇḍalam. To the southwest, south of Pangaḷanaḍu, Toṇḍaimaṇḍalam bordered the Vāṇakōppāḍi chieftaincy. In the south, Toṇḍaimaṇḍalam bordered the region of Naḍuvilnāḍu.

The core area covers the present day areas of Nellore, Chittoor, Tirupati, Annamayya, Vellore, Ranipet, Tirupattur, Tiruvannamalai, Villupuram, Tiruvallur, Kanchipuram, Chengalpattu, Cuddalore and Chennai districts of modern-day Andhra Pradesh and Tamil Nadu. In today's terms, Toṇḍaimaṇḍalam covers the Nellore, Chittoor, North and South Arcot and Chingleput districts of the Andhra and Madras states Chennai was part of the region.

Historically, Toṇḍaimaṇḍalam was divided into 24 kōṭṭams — smaller districts that were further subdivided into smaller agricultural districts called nāḍus, which were groupings of several agricultural villages. At the beginning of the historical period, the kōṭṭams were mostly pastoral, but they gradually became more agricultural over time. From the 7th through the 12th centuries in particular, the number of attested nāḍus in Toṇḍaimaṇḍalam steadily increases, corresponding with an expansion in irrigation works in the area.

Although Toṇḍaimaṇḍalam was stated (in later records) to have 24 kōṭṭams, only 22 are actually attested from contemporary sources (the number 24 may just be a "conventional" one). The 22 known kōṭṭams of Toṇḍaimaṇḍalam are as follows: (Note: Names in italics are listed here without diacritics because the spellings with diacritics could not be found in the source.)

1. Āmurkōṭṭam
2. Eyilkōṭṭam (which contained Kanchipuram)
3. Ikkadu-kottam
4. Indur-kottam
5. Kaḷatturkōṭṭam
6. Kāḻiyūrkōṭṭam
7. Kunravattana-kottam
8. Manayil-kottam
9. Melur-kottam
10. Paḍuvūrkottam
11. Paiyyurilan-kottam
12. Paiyyur-kottam
13. Palakunra-kottam
14. Pavvattiri-kottam
15. Puḻalkōṭṭam (also called Vikramasōḻa Vaḷanāḍu)
16. Puliyūr-kōṭṭam (also called Kulottunga Sōḻa Vaḷanāḍu)
17. Śembūrkōṭṭam
18. Sengattu-kottam
19. Tamar-kottam
20. Tiru Vengada Kottam
21. Urrukkattu-kottam
22. Venkunra-kottam

== History ==
Neolithic burial urns, cairn circles and jars with burials dating to the very dawn of the common era have been discovered near Mamallapuram. The area was part of the Dravida kingdom mentioned in the Mahabharata. It then came under the rule of Early Cholas during first century CE with the capital of Tondai Nadu as Kanchipuram. Historian S. Krishnaswami Aiyengar and the Proceedings of the First Annual Conference of South Indian History Congress note: The word Tondai means a creeper and the term Pallava conveys a similar meaning. In the 3rd century CE, Tondai Nadu was ruled by Ilandiraiyan, the first king with the title "Tondaiman", whom P. T. Srinivasa Iyengar identifies with a Pallava prince. Pallavas moved southwards, adopted local traditions to their own use, and named themselves as Tondaiyar after the land called Tondai. The medieval Pallavas ruled Andhra and Northern Tamil Nadu, from the 4th to the 9th centuries, with their seat of capital at ancient Kanchipuram.

=== Sangam period and Pallava dynasty ===
In early historical times, At 1st century kurumba(shepheard people) are lived and ruled over the land.that time Tondaimandalam appears to have been a predominantly pastoral region, with comparatively little settled agriculture. Large hilly tracts and dense forests broke the countryside up into smaller pockets of farmland, which could only support relatively small, dispersed settlements. The main source on Toṇḍaimaṇḍalam's geography during this early period is the Perumpāṇāṟṟuppaṭai, a poem written c. 190-200 CE and counted as part of the classical Sangam literature. Its description of the region "points to large tracts of unsettled land, forest and hilly regions, with few settlements and still fewer big ones". On the other hand, Pallava-era inscriptions frequently mention cattle, either as gifts to temples or as the target for raids, indicating that a significant proportion of the local population was engaged in animal husbandry.

It was under the early medieval Pallavas that intensive agriculture and urbanisation began to spread in Toṇḍaimaṇḍalam. The process continued well into the Chola period. The first phase was one of "agrarian expansion", where irrigation works, crop rotation, increased organisation, and an expansion in cultivated area were employed to convert subsistence-agriculture villages into surplus-oriented ones (called ūrs). This process appears to have initially begun with brahmadeya villages, i.e. villages given as tax-free grants to Brahmins, in the 7th through 9th centuries. These grants were "invariably accompanied by irrigation works" and involved "elaborate arrangements for their upkeep by sabhās or Brahmin assemblies". Inscriptions from this period record details like demarcation of land boundaries, provision of desilting or repair works for irrigation facilities, and the number and type of crops to be grown. In the 9th and 10th centuries, land grants to temples also became a major catalyst for agricultural expansion. Once implemented, the agricultural innovations that were originally intended to sustain large populations in brahmadeyas and temple centres were expanded to other villages not affiliated with any sort of grant because there was a major economic incentive to do so.

By the 9th century, commercial exchange among the ūrs had grown to a point where new market centres were needed. Commerce from the 7th through 9th centuries was mostly designed to serve the royal court at Kanchipuram, and was mostly done at Kanchipuram and its royal port of Māmallapuram.

=== Chola dynasty ===
It was captured by the Medieval Chola king Aditya I (ruled c. 871–907 CE), who defeated the armies of the Pallava ruler Aparajitavarman (880–897) in about 890. and claimed all of Tondai Nadu as Chola territory. During the reign of Uttama Chola most of Tondaimandalam had been recovered from the Rashtrakutas. The province was renamed Jayamkonda Cholamandalam during the reign of King Raja Raja Chola I (985–1014), In about 1218, the Pandya king Maravarman Sundara Pandyan (1216–1238) invaded the kingdom. It was stopped by the intervention of the Hoysala king Vira Narasimha II (1220–1235), who fought on the side of the Chola king Kulothunga Chola III.Pandyan emperor Jatavarman Sundara Pandyan I conquered Tondaimandalam till Nellore including Kadapa after defeating Nellore Choda ruler Vijaya Gandagopala and Ganapati II of Kakatiyas in 1258 CE. Tondaimandalam came under Madurai Sultanate after the fall of Pandyan Empire in 1323 CE.

=== Vijayanagara ===
This region was then a part of Vijayanagara Empire, first ruling from Hampi and then headquartered at Chandragiri in present-day Andhra Pradesh. The earliest inscriptions attesting to Vijayanagara rule are those of Kumara Kampana, who defeated the Madurai Sultanate in 1361. from 1364 and 1367, which were found in the precincts of the Kailasanathar Temple and Varadharaja Perumal Temple respectively. The Vijayanagara rulers who controlled the area, appointed chieftains known as Nayaks who ruled over the different regions of the province almost independently. Throughout the second half of the 16th and first half of the 17th centuries, the Aravidu Dynasty tried to maintain a semblance of authority in the southern parts after losing their northern territories in the Battle of Talikota.

=== Early modern age ===
Venkata II (1586–1614) tried to revive the Vijayanagara Empire, but the kingdom relapsed into confusion after his death and rapidly fell apart after the Vijayanagara king Sriranga III's defeat by the Golconda and Bijapur sultanates in 1646. The Nawabdom of the Carnatic was established by the Mughal Emperor Aurangzeb, who in 1692 appointed Zulfiqar Ali Khan as the first Nawab of the Carnatic. The area saw Maratha rule during the Carnatic period in 1724 and 1740, and the Nizam of Hyderabad in 1742. It was formally annexed by the British East India Company as per the Doctrine of Lapse after the death of Ghulam Muhammad Ghouse Khan. During the British Rule, the whole region was a part of the Madras Presidency.

== Sources ==
- Iyengar, P. T. Srinivasa (1929). History of the Tamils from the Earliest Times to the Present Day. Madras: University of Madras. ISBN 978-81-206-0145-1.
- Sastri, Kallidaikurichi Aiyah Nilakanta (1935) [1935]. The Cōlas. Madras: University of Madras.
- Sastri, Kallidaikurichi Aiyah Nilakanta (1961), A History of South India: From Prehistoric Times to the Fall of Vijayanagar (3rd ed.), Oxford University Press
- K.V., Raman (1975). Sri Varadarajaswami Temple, Kanchi: A Study of Its History, Art and Architecture. New Delhi: Abhinav Publications. ISBN 8170170265.
- Rao, P.V.L. Narasimha (2008). Kanchipuram – Land of Legends, Saints & Temples. New Delhi: Readworthy Publications (P) Ltd. ISBN 978-93-5018-104-1.
- Aiyangar, Sakkottai Krishnaswami (2004). Ancient India: Collected Essays on the Literary and Political History of. New Delhi: Asian Educational Services. ISBN 81-206-1850-5.
