= Kanchipuram in the pre-Pallava period =

The Kanchipuram district is in North Tamil Nadu Kanchipuram is believed to have been mentioned in the Tamil epic Manimekhalai.

In the 4th century AD, Kanchipuram emerged from an obscure past to become the capital of the Pallava Empire. The city was at the height of its power during the 7th century AD when it was visited by the Chinese traveller Hiuen Tsang.

== Etymology ==
Some scholars believe that Kanchipuram might have been derived from the "Kanjiyur" which is mentioned in early Tamil poems. Kanjiyur is a place in the Chola country and its name means "place surrounded by Kanji trees". Kanjiyur is mentioned in several early texts, one among them being the Puṟanāṉūṟu.

However, Dravidologist and professor of history, P. T. Srinivasa Iyengar, in his book History of the Tamils from the Earliest Times to 600AD, claims that the Kanjiyur mentioned in early Tamil poems was not Kanchipuram at all but a different town altogether.

Srinivasa Iyengar claims that Kanchipuram was a Sanskrit word and that the town had no Tamil name. In support of his claim, he states that Kanchipuram is mentioned in the books of the Sanskrit grammarian Patanjali, who lived in the 3rd–2nd century BC. On the contrary, the first references to Kanchipuram in Tamil literature, was in Perumpāṇāṟṟuppaṭai, a eulogy of Ilandiraiyan, which was written as late as the 2nd century AD. Here, though, Kanchi is not mentioned in its Sanskrit form Kanchi, but in its Prakrit form Kacci.

On basis of this evidence, Srinivasa Iyengar concludes that Kanchipuram might have been the southernmost outpost of Sanskrit culture.

== Northern frontier of the Ancient Tamil country ==
The northernmost province of the ancient Tamil country was the district of Aruva (present-day South Arcot district). The regions beyond Aruva were known as Aruvavadadalai. The Kanchipuram district had no specific name until the late Pallava period when it got the name Tondaimandalam.

== History ==
=== Prehistoric ===
Henry Bruce Foote's discovery of pre-historic stone axe at Pallavaram in 1863 indicates that the region might have been occupied as early as the Stone Ages. Archaeological findings from a later period even indicate a thriving Iron Age settlement. Animal fossils and stone implements found at kanchipuram to the north-west of Chennai city could very well be over 85000 years old.

=== 'Dravida' ===
The earliest references of Kanchipuram have been in the Sanskrit texts of Patanjali. The Dravida kingdom of the Mahabharatha must have been centred on the Kanchipuram region. According to one tradition, Chandragupta Maurya's minister Chanakya was a native of Dravida. One of Chanakya's various names was Dramila, the Sanskrit form of "Tamilian". Kanchipuram is also mentioned as Satyavrataksetra in the Bhagavata Purana, after the king Satyavrata who ruled over the region. Eventually, all the kings of Kanchi until the time of the Pallavas, held the title "Satyaputra" or the "son of Satyavrata".

=== 'Talagunda Inscription 450 AD' ===
According to the Talagunda_pillar_inscription 450 AD, Mayurasharma of Kadamba dynasty went to Kanchi the capital of the Pallavas to pursue his Vedic studies accompanied by his guru and grandfather Veerasharma. Kanchi was an important Ghatikasthana (centre of learning) at that time.

=== Rise of the Agamic cults ===
The Kanchipuram region is one of the first regions in the Tamil country to witness the rise of the Agamic cults. Sanskrit texts of the centuries which immediately precede the Christian era mention Kanchipuram amongst the seven holy temple cities in India. A number of Buddhist monasteries were built during the time of the Mauryan Emperor Ashoka. Buddhist and Jain relics in the region attest to fairly significant Buddhist and Jain presence in the city at the time.

== See also ==
- Dravida kingdom
- Tamil Sangams
