= Chandole =

Chandole Dhandapura, Tsandavolu
- Village
- Interactive map of Chandole
- Location in Andhra Pradesh, India
- Coordinates: 16°00′25″N 80°36′42″E
- Country: India
- State: Andhra Pradesh
- District: Bapatla
- Mandal: Pittalavanipalem

Government
  - Type: Panchayati raj
  - Body: Chandole gram panchayat

Area
  - Total: 1,333 ha (3,290 acres)

Population (2011)
  - Total: 11,342
  - Density: 850.9/km^{2} (2,204/sq mi)

Languages
  - Official: Urdu & Telugu
- Time zone: UTC+5:30 (IST)
- PIN: 522311
- Area code: +91–08643
- Vehicle registration: AP

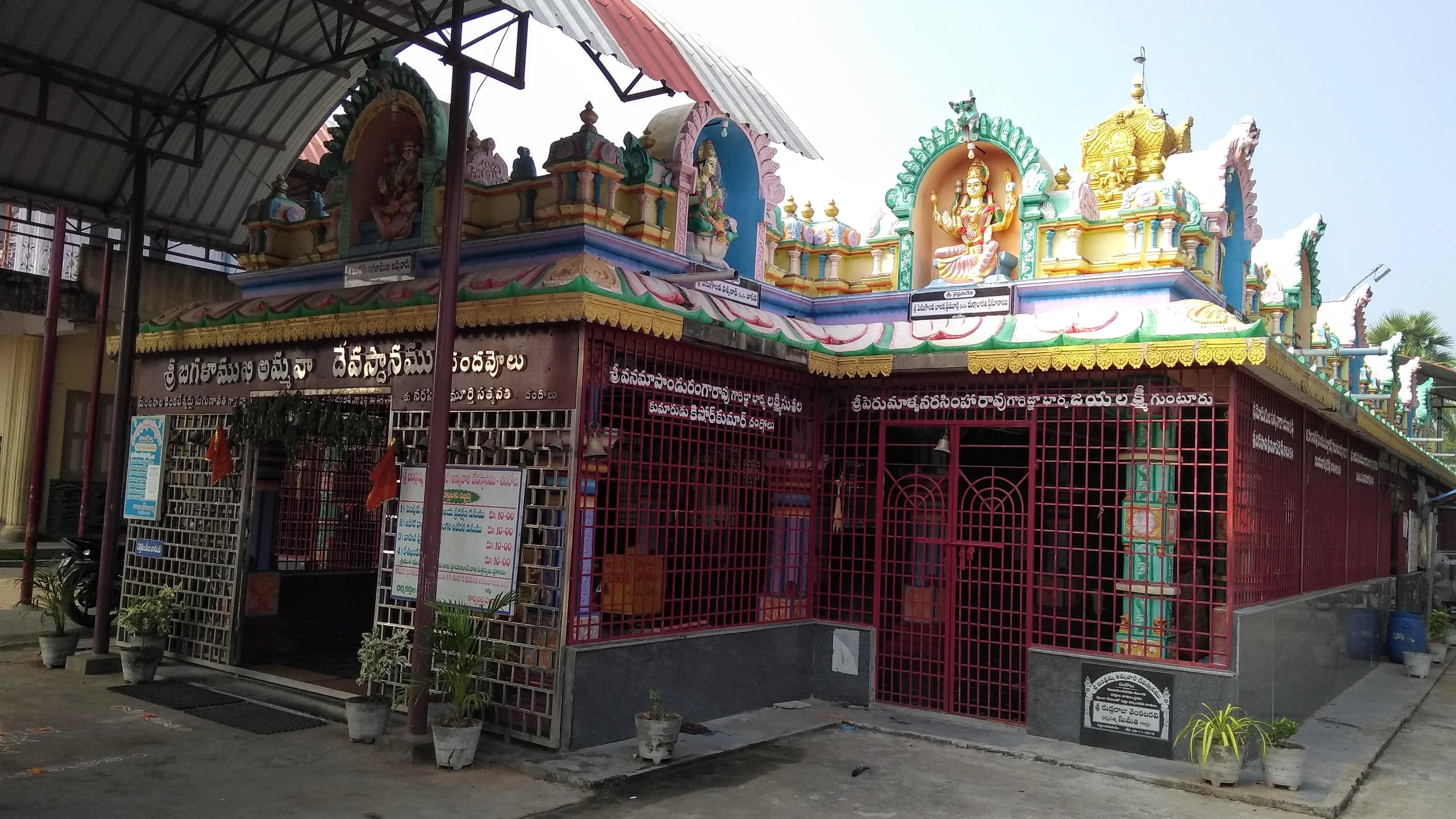
Bagalamukhi (Ballamma) Temple, Chandole

Chandole is a village in Bapatla district of the Indian state of Andhra Pradesh. It is located in Pittalavanipalem mandal of Bapatla revenue division.

== History ==
Bhattiprolu and Buddham are nearby villages wherein archaeologists located a stupa from 3-2 BCE with relics of the Buddha and a bronze Buddha statue dated to 8 CE, respectively.

Velanadu is said to be 'an old name for Chandhavolu country' (i.e., western part of Kistna delta) The chieftains who ruled over Velanadu came to be known as the Velanati Chodas and belonged to the Durjaya family. They were subordinate allies of the Chalukya dynasty of South India. They were entrusted with the governance of the Andhra region, which formed a part of the Chola Kingdom in the 12th century. Their capital was Dhanadapura, which is now Chandolu.

Chandolu inscriptions have illuminated the details of the history of the Telugu Chodas of Velanadu. According to the poetic work Keyura-bahu-charitramu, the country enjoyed plenty and prosperity. "The capital Dhanadapura (Chandolu) was a magnificent city with beautiful structures and opulent markets. It was comparable to the city of Kubera". Mallikarjuna Panditaradhyudu's Śivatatvasāram and Palkuriki Somanatha's Basava Puranam reflect the prosperity of Dhanadapura. Mallikarjuna Panditaradhyudu debated with Buddhist scholars in the court of King Velanati Choda of Chandavolu. There is a mound outside village which may have Buddhist remains.

In 2019, a 855-years-old Telugu inscription on a pillar by Kulotthunga Rajendra Choda, a Velanti chief who ruled from Chandolu, was rediscovered at Enikepadu, on the outskirts of Vijayawada. A manual of Krishna district in Madras Presidency, published in 1883, saus, "The country between Tsandavolu and Tenali awaits an archeologist, for in almost every village there are inscriptions not yet properly deciphered". Rudra Deva's son Ganapati overcame Velanadu chieftains is indicated by existence of an inscription of his at Chandhavolu, their kingdom. The village was the seat of the Velanati Chodas in the 12th century, the most famous of whom was Rajendra Choda I. It was a flourishing town during the Choda era. It was also called Dhandapura or Tsandavole.

The village is mentioned in ancient ballads and poems. In the temple are four inscriptions, three bearing dates equivalent to 1154, 1171, and 1176. A ruined fort, dating to 15 -16th century, was recognized as a historical protected monument Bandlamma temple, dating to the 18th century, is another protected monument. Bandlamma is a Dravidian goddess.

== Government and politics ==
Chandole gram panchayat is the local self-government of the village. It is divided into wards and each ward is represented by a ward member. The ward members are headed by a Sarpanch.

== Education ==
As per the school information report for the academic year 2018–19, the village has a total of 18 schools. These include 5 private, one other type and 12 Zilla Parishad/Mandal Parishad schools.

== Transport ==
=== Ancient roads ===
From Tsandavolu, roads go to Bapatla and Ponnur with a small branch to the lock at Intur and old trace of Madras road has an avenue of tree. From Tsandavolu, the line of old Madras road goes south-west to Bapatla crossing a channel by a good bridge near Buddam. This channel and canal both enter back water close to Nizampatnam. In 1679, Mr. Streynsham Master earmarked that the proper name is Nyshampatnam.

=== Present roads ===
The village is connected with Ponnur, Tenali, Repalle, Nizampatnam and Bapatla by road.
