= Kadiyalur Uruttirangannanar =

Kadiyalur Uruttirangannanar (3rd/4th century CE) was a Tamil poet of the Sangam period. He is credited with the composition of the Paṭṭiṉappālai and the Perumpāṇāṟṟuppaṭai in the Pattuppāṭṭu anthology and song 167 of the Akanaṉūṟu and 352 of the Kuṟuntokai. According to P. T. Srinivasa Iyengar, he lived between the late 3rd and early 4th centuries CE and was a contemporary of the king of Kanchipuram Ilandiraiyan.

== Biography ==
Uruttirangannanar was born in a Brahmin family in the village of Kadiyalur in the present-day Vellore district.

== See also ==
- Sangam literature
- List of Sangam poets
