= Ilandiraiyan =

Tondaiman Ilandiraiyan or Ilamtiraiyan was a ruler of Kanchipuram and a contemporary of the Early Chola king, Karikala. He is traditionally regarded as the founder of the Pallava dynasty. Ilandiraiyan is referred to in the literature of the Sangam period and is the hero of some of the poems in the Pathupattu. He was a poet himself and four of his songs are extant even today. He ruled from Tondaimandalam and was known as 'Tondaman'. According to historian S. Krishnaswami Aiyengar, the Pallavas were natives of Tondaimandalam and the name Pallava is identical with the word Tondaiyar.

Scholar M. Arokiaswami identifies Tondaiman Ilandiraiyan with king Adondai Chakravarthi, the legendary figure who is referred to in the Mackenzie Manuscripts.

== Life ==
According to the Sangam epic Manimekalai, a son was born to the Chola king Killi and the naga princess Pilivalai of Jaffna, the daughter of king Valaivanan of Manipallavam. When the boy grew up the princess wanted to send her son to the Chola kingdom. So she entrusted the prince to a merchant who dealt in woolen blankets called Kambala Chetty when his ship stopped in the island of Manipallavam. During the voyage to the Chola kingdom, the ship was wrecked due to rough weather and the boy was lost. He was later found washed ashore with a Tondai twig (creeper) around his leg. So he came to be called Tondaiman Ilam Tiraiyan meaning the young one of the seas or waves. When he grew up the northern part of the Chola kingdom was entrusted to him and the area he governed came to be called Tondaimandalam after him. He is considered by some scholars to be the progenitor of the Pallava dynasty and the dynasty he founded took its name after the native place of his mother, that is Manipallavam.

According to the Ulas(historical poems in honor of Chola kings) written by poet Ottakoothar, Killivalavan is said to have married a Naga princess by entering the bilvadara(cave) and also it is known that Tiraiyan was the son of a Chola prince who married the Naga princess, Pilivalai by entering the bilvadara in Nagapattinam. So that Tiraiyan was the son of Killivalavan is not without force". According to P. T. Srinivasa Iyengar, Ilandiraiyan ascended the throne of Kanchi during the reign of the Chola king Karikalan and was probably, a feudatory of the latter.

== In poetry ==
Uruttiragannanar who wrote the Paṭṭiṉappālai, gives a vivid description of Ilandiraiyan's kingdom and capital city of Kanchi in his poem Perumpāṇāṟṟuppaṭai. He advises "poets seeking rewards" to go to the court of Tondaiman Ilandiraiyan, "the great patron of bards". The Perumpāṇāṟṟuppaṭai contains 500 lines in the akaval metre eulogising Ilandiraiyan as well as providing a mythical origin for the Tondaiman clan.

Ilandiraiyan was also a poet himself with four of his songs still extant. One of them is on the importance of personal character and its benefits on good rule. Ode 185 of the Puṟanāṉūṟu is attributed to Tondaiman Ilandiraiyan.
