= Manchana =

Manchana may refer to:

- Tiquadra, a genus of moths belonging to the family Tineidae
- Manchana (poet), 12th or 13th century Telugu language poet from Velanati Choda kingdom of southern India
- Manchana Bhattaraka, a 7th century ruler of the Vishnukundina dynasty of southern India
