= Tiquadra syntripta =

Scientific classification
- Kingdom: Animalia
- Phylum: Arthropoda
- Class: Insecta
- Order: Lepidoptera
- Family: Tineidae
- Genus: Tiquadra
- Species: T. syntripta

Binomial name
- Tiquadra syntripta Meyrick, 1922

Species of moth

Tiquadra syntripta is a moth of the family Tineidae. It is known from Brazil.

This species has a wingspan of about 16 mm. The forewings are light greyish ochreous irregularly sprinkled fuscous and dark fuscous, with some irregular mottling along the costa, dorsum, and termen. There is a quadrate blotch of rather dark fuscous suffusion on the costa beyond the middle, touching a small spot on the end of the cell. A small cloudy rather dark fuscous spot is found on tornus, and a larger spot in the disc rather beyond this. The hindwings are light grey.
