= Mallikarjuna Panditaradhyudu =

Indian philosopher of Veerasaiva school

- మల్లికార్జున పండితారాధ్యుడు
- Born: c. 1110 CE; Draksharama (present-day Andhra Pradesh, India)
- Died: c. 1185 CE; Vellaturu (present-day Andhra Pradesh, India)
- Occupations: Poet, Philosopher
- Children: Kēdārayya Pandita
- Writing career
- Language: Telugu, Kannada
- Period: 12th century
- Genre: Śaiva literature
- Notable work: Śivatattvasāramu
- Literary movement: Bhakti movement, Veerashaivism

Mallikarjuna Panditaradhyudu (Telugu: [ˈmallikaːɾd͡ʒunpaɳɖitaːɾaːdʱjuɖu], Telugu: మల్లికార్జున పండితారాధ్యుడు, romanized: Mallikārjuna Paṇḍitārādhyuḍu) was an Indian philosopher of Veerasaiva school and a Telugu poet from Andhra region. He was a poet in the court of Velanati Choda king Rajendra Choda II. His Śivatatvasāramu was the first independent Telugu work. Being a unique person of his era he contributed in spreading Saivism throughout Andhra region. He was credited with ending the remnants of Buddhism in Andhra land through his intellect and influence. For his prowess in Telugu language, he was generally referred to as Telugu: కవిమల్లు, romanized: Kavimallu, lit. 'Wrestler among poets'.

== Birth and early life ==
Mallikarjuna was born at Draksharama in c. 1110 CE in a Saivite family. His parents were Bhimana pandita and Gouramba. His father was a priest in the Bhimeswara Temple at Drakasharama, which was one of the Pancharama Kshetras and also locally referred as Dakṣiṇakāśi (lit. Kasi in the South). His family followed Rgveda and of Gautama gotra. His guru was Aradhyadeva of Kotipalli from whom he received knowledge about Saivism. His birth anniversary is observed by some saivites during the month of Meena (i.e. mid-March to mid-April) on the day of Sravana nakshatram.

== Works ==
Mallikarjuna wrote Śivatattvasāramu which was the first independent work in Telugu. It had 489 short verses and contains information about the Saivism preached by him. He later translated that work into Kannada. It is one of the earliest Satakas in Telugu literature. His works are placed in the 'Siva Kavi era' of Telugu literature which roughly corresponds to the period between 1100 CE and 1250 CE. The trio of Nanne Choda, Mallikarjuna and Somanatha are referred as Śivakavitrayam (i.e. Trio of Saivite Poets). These trio along with Piduparthi poets and Yathavakkula Annamayya pioneered Veera Saiva movement in Andhra region. Some other works by Mallikarjuna include Lingōdbhava Gadyam, Amarēśvara Śatakam, Gangā Sahasramāla and Rudramahima.

== Contribution to Saivism ==
Mallikarjuna was influenced by Basaveswara. He seems to be the very first Telugu poet who laud Basaveswara in Andhra region. He contributed to the emergence of Aradhya sect which encompasses elements from Vedic traditions and Veerashaivism. Mallikarjuna, Śripati Paṇḍita and Mancanna Paṇḍita (also known as Sivalenka) are prominent among founders of Panditaradhya saivite sects during Middle Ages in Andhra region. These three were referred as Paṇḍitatrayam (i.e. Trio of Scholars) in Veera Saiva tradition. These three were disciples of Basava. The descendants of Mallikarjuna came to be known as Aradhya Saivites. However, Mallikarjuna differs from Basava on the aspects of the authority of Vedas and Varna system. Nevertheless, few centuries later the amicable relations between Aradhya saivism of Mallikarjuna and Lingayatism of Basava became a necessity in the wake of Islamic invasions from the North (i.e. Delhi Sultanate).

== Biography ==
Veerasaivite poet Palkuriki Somanatha wrote 'Paṇḍitārādhyacaritamu' which contains a legendary biography of Mallikarjuna. This work belongs to the Caritrakāvyamu genre of Telugu literature that contains generally legendary biographies of a notable personality. With an initiative by Andhra Patrika founder and freedom fighter Kasinadhuni Nageswara Rao, the historian and Telugu scholar Chilukuri Narayana Rao edited this work by Somanatha after referring to some ancient palmleaf manuscripts. It was later published under the name Paṇḍitārādhyacaritra in 1939.

== See also ==
- Palkuriki Somanatha
- Basava
- Veerashaivism
- Lingayatism
