= Chagi =

Telugu dynasty

The Chagis (or Tyagis) were a medieval chiefly lineage in Andhra.

== History ==
The Chagis ruled over the regions of Natavadi and Vijayavati Vishayas for nearly three and a half centuries, with capitals located at Gudimetta, Vijayawada, and Vinukonda. They served as vassals to successive major powers, including the Chalukya-Cholas, the Kakatiyas, and later the Gajapatis. The ruling family bore the surname Vipparla and entered into marriage alliances with influential dynasties such as the Kakatiyas and Kondapadumatis. The Chagi inscriptions trace their ancestry to the legendary Durjaya lineage, a common ancestral claim among several Andhra dynasties. The earliest known figure in the family was Muppa I, followed by rulers like Dora I, Pota I, Dora II, Pota II, Ganapaya, Dora III, Manuma Pota, and Manuma Ganapaya.

A related branch of the dynasty ruled from Vinukonda and is distinguished by the use of the honorific titles "Nayaka" or "Nayudu" in their names, suggesting a possible military or administrative role. Chiefs such as Annama Nayaka, Gannama Nayaka, and Komma Nayaka are mentioned in inscriptions from this branch. Although the exact relationship between the Vinukonda and Gudimetta branches remains unclear, the titles indicate that the Vinukonda Chagis likely held high-ranking positions in regional governance or the army.
