= Pruthviswara =

Velanati Chodas
Durjaya Chieftains of Velanadu
- Gonka I: 1076–1108
- Rajendra Choda I: 1108–1132
- Gonka II: 1132–1161
- Rajendra Choda II: 1161–1181
- Gonka III: 1181–1186
- Pruthviswara: 1186–1207
- Rajendra Choda III: 1207–1216

Pruthviswara II was a Telugu king of Velanati Chodas who ruled from 1186 to 1207 AD.

He was the last important ruler of the kingdom and he stayed at Pithapuram. He made several vain attempts to win the lost prestige. When Kakatiyas were fighting Yadavas, he seized the opportunity and reoccupied Verlanadu including places like Chandolu and Vengi. However he lost to Kakatiyas and Nellore Chodas starting from 1201 to 1207 AD.

Preceded by Gonka III	Velanati Chodas; 1186 –1207	Succeeded by Rajendra Choda III
