= Tiquadra reversella =

Scientific classification
- Kingdom: Animalia
- Phylum: Arthropoda
- Class: Insecta
- Order: Lepidoptera
- Family: Tineidae
- Genus: Tiquadra
- Species: T. reversella

Binomial name
- Tiquadra reversella Walker, 1866

Synonyms
- Ventia reversella Walker, 1866

Species of moth

Tiquadra reversella is a moth of the family Tineidae. It is known from Brazil.
