= Epic of Katamaraju =

Telugu narrative based in Andhra Pradesh

The Epic of Katamaraju refers to a Telugu narrative epic about a historical hero in the Indian state of Andhra Pradesh.

== Background ==
Yadava King Katamaraju was a descendant of Krishna's family, and about 23 generations were found on some stone inscriptions, palm leaf manuscripts and copper plate inscription. Thus he is believed to be a 23rd-generation descendant of Krishna. He won the war with Nalla Siddi. That war story often referred to as a ballad cycle by scholars. It is composed of a number of episodes which are often sung independently. During the annual ceremonies honoring the lives of the deified heroes of the epic, large numbers of people of the Golla Community (Yadava) and kommavaru caste, gather on the banks of the Paleru River in Prakasam district where the great battle took place, to perform a ritual dramatization in connection with the recitation of the epic.

== The epic ==
The epic tells the story of Katamaraju, a chieftain in Kanigiri, who fought a battle with the Nellore Chola king Nalama Siddi, on the banks of the Paleru River in the 13th century. Katamaraju, due to severe drought, had migrated with his people to the fertile lands of Nellore. There he entered a covenant with the king of Nellore for grazing his cattle and sheep. Due to a misunderstanding, the covenant was broken and resulted in a tremendous battle in which many of the great heroes on both sides lost their lives.

About the year 1260, a dangerous feud broke out between Manumasiddhi II and Katamaraju, the chief of Erragaddapadu in Kanigiri region. The feud was on the issue of the rights of the two princes to use certain wide meadows as grazing grounds for their flocks of cattle. It led to the fierce engagement of the two sides and the bloody battle was fought at Panchalingala on the Paleru river. Manumasiddhi's forces led by Khadga Tikkana, the cousin of poet Tikkana won the battle, but the leader perished. This feud and the consequent battle formed the theme of the popular ballad entitled "Katamaraju Katha". Shortly after this disastrous battle, Manumasiddhi died.

With the death of Manumasiddhi II, the Nellore Chola kingdom lost its individuality, became a battle ground between the Kakatiyas and the Pandyas and changed hands frequently. In the reign of Kakatiya Prataparudra II, the Nellore region became part and parcel of the Kakatiya empire and lost its political significance.

== Bibliography ==
- Jackson-Laufer, Guida Myrl, ed. (1994). "KĀṬAMARĀJU KATHA". Encyclopedia of traditional epics. Santa Barbara, Calif.: ABC-CLIO. pp. 321–322.
- Claus, Peter J. (2003). "KĀṬAMA RĀJU". South Asian Folklore: An Encyclopedia. Routledge. pp. 329–330.
