= Tiquadra semiglobata =

Scientific classification
- Kingdom: Animalia
- Phylum: Arthropoda
- Class: Insecta
- Order: Lepidoptera
- Family: Tineidae
- Genus: Tiquadra
- Species: T. semiglobata

Binomial name
- Tiquadra semiglobata Meyrick, 1922

Species of moth

Tiquadra semiglobata is a moth of the family Tineidae. It is known from Peru.

This species has a wingspan of about 18 mm. The forewings are white with six small spots of dark grey irroration (sprinkling) on the costa and some small faint greyish spots or dots in the disc. There is a hemispherical grey blotch somewhat mixed white extending on the dorsum from near the base to the middle and reaching more than half across the wing. The hindwings are grey.
