= Tiquadra exercitata =

Scientific classification
- Kingdom: Animalia
- Phylum: Arthropoda
- Class: Insecta
- Order: Lepidoptera
- Family: Tineidae
- Genus: Tiquadra
- Species: T. exercitata

Binomial name
- Tiquadra exercitata Meyrick, 1922

Species of moth

Tiquadra exercitata is a moth of the family Tineidae. It is known from Santa Catarina, Brazil.

The wingspan is about 42 mm. The forewings are grey whitish irrorated (speckled) dark grey, with some strigulae (fine streaks) of dark grey irroration on the anterior half of the costa, and one or two posteriorly. There are obscure grey dots indicating the stigmata, a slight grey dash in the middle of the disc between these, as well as a curved transverse series of three or four dark grey dots near the apex. The hindwings are rather dark grey, paler towards the base.
