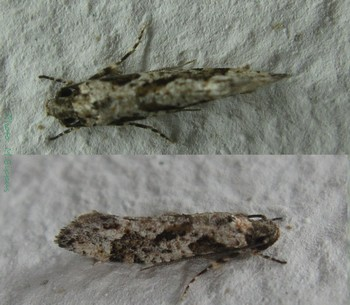

Scientific classification
- Kingdom: Animalia
- Phylum: Arthropoda
- Class: Insecta
- Order: Lepidoptera
- Family: Tineidae
- Genus: Tiquadra
- Species: T. guillermeti

Binomial name
- Tiquadra guillermeti Viette, 1988

= Tiquadra guillermeti =

Species of moth

Tiquadra guillermeti is a moth of the family Tineidae. It is endemic in Réunion island in the Indian Ocean, where it is quite common in natural and secondary habitats.

It has a length of approximately 8–9 mm.

== See also ==
- List of moths of Réunion
