= Perumbanappadi =

Perumbanappadi was the original home of the historic Bana Chieftains of the early Pallava period. It extended from the South Pennar (Ponnaiyar River) to the Tirupati (Thirumala) hills. Perumbanappadi was made up of sub-divisions such as the Thiruvenkata-Kottam (or Vengada Kottam), and many Nadus such as Tuy-nadu, Puli-nadu, Vada Pulinadu, and Silai-nadu within it. During the Chola period, Perumbanappadi was a major division of the Jayakonda Chola Mandalam. and also represented the north-western portions of Thondai-Mandalam.

== Boundaries ==
Perumbanappadi is rendered in Tamil as Perum-pana-p-pati and Pana Rashtra (Bana Rashtra). The boundaries of Perumbanappadi were made up of Kolar, Punganur and Srisailam in the west, and Kalahasti and Sholingur in the east. The river Palar (a.k.a. South Pennar and Ponniyar) formed its Southern boundary. The capital of Perumbanappadi was Thiruvallam, which lies 22 km from Vellore.

Mavali Vanadarayan was the title of chiefs of the Bana country in the basin of the Palar river, the extent of whose territory changed according to the vicissitudes of history. Territorial changes are deducible from epigraphies. However, the personal names of many Bana Chieftains are not known, especially with regard to the wars they waged against their opponents. One such example is the Thiruvallam record of Vijaya Nandivikrama Varman (792-793 AD) which states that a certain Mavali-Vanaraya was ruling Vadugavali-12000. However, the personal name of this Mahavali-Banaraja is not known.

Most epigraphies / inscriptions mention just the title of the Bana Chieftain as "Mahabali Banaraja". The Banas were identified by their geographical location as Pulinadu Banas, Tuynadu Banas, etc. Their genealogy was puranic and was narrated on copper-plates or temple grants. One example is the Udayendiram grant of Bana Vikramaditya III which narrates the puranic connection of Mahabali with Vishnu.

== Bana Chieftains ==
The Bana chieftains claimed descent from the asura Mahabali. They were called or addressed as Perumbanadiyarasar (Brihad Bana Adhirajas) or Mahabali Banarajas. Chiefs in the early period held names such as Perumbana-araicar and figured in the hero-stones (vira-kal). The Bali Vamsa claimed traditional lordship over Kishkinda. They had over their banner the figure of an Ape and as their heraldic device the figure of a Turtle.

== Chieftains of Perumbanappadi ==
Names of some Bana chieftains who ruled in different parts of Perumbanappadi are:

- From the epigraphies of kings who made endowments to Sri Varadarajaswami Temple of Kanchipuram, we find the name of Mahabalivanarayar
- Vikramaditya I Bana had a daughter named Kundadevi who was given in marriage to the Ganga King, Prithvipati I Ganga in the 9th century. This however did not prevent the Gangas and Nolambas from combining to fight against the Banas
- The Chirrur plate of Nripatunga Varman mentions a Bana Chieftain, titled Paranjaya and called as Kadupatti Muttaraiyan.
