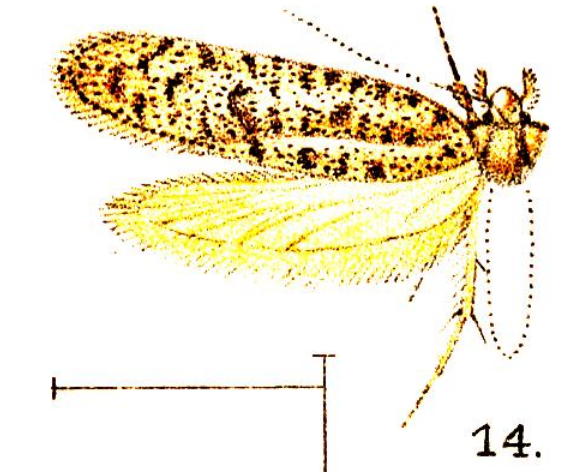
- Tiquadra inscitella

Scientific classification
- Kingdom: Animalia
- Phylum: Arthropoda
- Clade: Pancrustacea
- Class: Insecta
- Order: Lepidoptera
- Family: Tineidae
- Genus: Tiquadra
- Species: T. inscitella

Binomial name
- Tiquadra inscitella Walker, 1863

= Tiquadra inscitella =

Species of moth

Tiquadra inscitella is a moth of the family Tineidae. It is known to come from the southern states of the USA and Mexico.
