= Tiquadra mallodeta =

Scientific classification
- Kingdom: Animalia
- Phylum: Arthropoda
- Class: Insecta
- Order: Lepidoptera
- Family: Tineidae
- Genus: Tiquadra
- Species: T. mallodeta

Binomial name
- Tiquadra mallodeta Meyrick, 1924

Species of moth

Tiquadra mallodeta is a moth of the family Tineidae. It is known from Mexico.

This species has a wingspan of 28–30 mm. The forewings are whitish grey with a white gloss, sprinkled grey, and with scattered small indistinct grey spots, on the costa and termen stronger dark grey small spots or transverse strigulae, two spots beyond the middle of the costa somewhat larger. There is a moderate oval grey spot in the disc at two-thirds, and a crescentic bar before the apex. The hindwings are grey.
