= Mrs. A. V. N. College =

Arts and science college in Andhra Pradesh, India

Mrs. A.V.N. College
- Former names: Hindu College
- Type: Autonomous
- Established: 1860
- Founders: Sri. Ankitam Venkata Narasimha Rao
- Affiliations: Andhra University, Visakhapatnam, Andhra Pradesh.
- Principal: Smt . P . Krishna Kumari M.SC(Organic Chem)(P.hd)
- Location: 21-1-17, One Town, AVN College Road, Behind KGH, Visakhapatnam, Andhra Pradesh, India; 17°42′15.01″N 83°18′4.53″E
- Campus: Urban
- Website: Official website

Mrs. A.V.N. College, founded in 1860, is an arts and science college in Visakhapatnam in the state of Andhra Pradesh, India.

== History ==
The institution was founded in 1860 as a school and grew with the support of the public, especially the zamindars of the time. It gained the status of a high school in 1866 with a European headmaster, Mr. E. Winckler, who became the principal in 1878 when it was elevated to the status of a college in the name Hindu College as a second-grade college affiliated to Madras University.

Other principals who succeeded him were Messrs H. H. Anderson, R. S. Sheppard, W. Ramaiah, and P. T. Srinivasa Iyengar. In 1892, Ankitam Venkata Narasimha Rao, a landlord endowed the amount of Rs one lakh, an 11-acre site and a huge building, besides a building grant of ₹15,000 in memory of his wife. The college thus came to be known by her name, i.e., Mrs. A.V.N College

The college was started with a strength of 50 in 1878. In 1938, the institution celebrated its Diamond Jubilee. In 1938–39, the strength of the college was 227 and of the high school was 732.

== Administration ==
Ms. Indrani Jagga Row, vice-chairperson, was appointed as correspondent of the college on 1 December 1993. She made a holy beginning of her activities with the consecration of Lord Shiva in the temple constructed by Shri A. V. N. Jagga Row within the college premises. In 2014, Indrani Jaggarow's son, Sri A.V. Adeep Bhanoji Row, was appointed as correspondent and Indrani Jaggarow took the role of vice chairperson again. The Visakhapatnam district magistrate holds the authority of chairperson according to the will of the founder Sri A. V. Narasinga Row.

== Academics ==
In 1960, the institution celebrated its centenary. In the beginning, the college had very few subject combinations at the Intermediate level, but now the college has many combinations of subjects both at Intermediate and Degree levels. In B.Sc., restructured courses were introduced like Bio-Chemistry, Fisheries, Electronics, Computer Science and Statistics. Every year, the college produces students achieving top ranks in IIT, EAMCET, EDCET, AUCET, LAWCET, Civil Services and university examinations.

Currently the courses offered by the institution are Primary and Secondary Schooling, Intermediate(formerly PUC), UG Courses (B.Sc., B.Com.), P.G. Course (M.Com.), Diploma in Engineering (Polytechnic), Diploma in Elementary Education (D.El.Ed.). The diploma courses were introduced in 2012.

The college was awarded NAAC B++ grade by the peer review team in 2023.

== Notable alumni ==
- Dwaram Venkataswamy Naidu, carnatic violinist
- Alluri Sitarama Raju, revolutionary in the Indian independence movement
- Sir C. V. Raman, Nobel Laureate, Physics
- Prof. C. R. Rao, mathematician (Padma Vibhushan)
- S. V. Ranga Rao, film actor
- Tenneti Viswanadham, politician and independence fighter

== Principals of college ==
Name	Qualifications	From year	To year	Remarks
Mr. E. Winckler	B.A.	1878	1884	
Mr. H. H. Anderson	B.A.	1884	1885	
Mr. R. S. Sheppard	B.A.	1886	1888	
Mr. W. Ramayya	B.A.	1888	1890	
Mr. P. T. Srinivasa Iyengar	M.A.L.T.	1890	1917	
Sri S. Krishnaswamy Iyer	B.A.L.T.	1917	1930	
Mr. M. Kamayya Pantulu	M.A.L.T.	1930	1941	
Mr. S. Parthasarathi Naidu	M.A.L.T.	1941	1951	
Mr. V. S. Somayaji	B.A. (Hons)	1951	1955	
Mr. C. Suryaprakasam	M.A, B.Ed.	1955	1965	
Mr. D. Ramamurthy	M.A, Vidwan	1965	1975	
Mr. V. Brahmaji Rao	B.Sc. (Hons), M.Sc.	1975	1976	
Lt.Cdr N. Viswanadham	M.Sc., M.Tech.	1976	1984	
Mr. M. Rama Rao	M.Com.	1984	1989	Principal I/C
Mr. R. Swaminathan	B.A (Hons)	1989	1989	Principal I/C
Mr. Bh.V. Seetharama Swamy	B.Sc. (Hons)	1989	1990	Principal I/C
Mr. G. B. Ramdas	M.Sc.	1990	1991	
Mr. K. S. Prasad	M.Com.	1992	1993	Principal I/C
Mr. J. S. Prakasa Rao	M.A.	1993	1995	
Ms. P. Durgakumari	B.Sc. (Hons)	1996	1999	
Mr. Bh.S. Krishna Murthy	M.A.	1999	2002	
Dr. G. Sivarama Krishna	M.Sc., Ph.D.	2002	2005	
Mr. P. V. S. Kameswara Rao	M.A	2005	2006	
Mr. N. Venkateswara Rao	M.Com.	2006	2007	
Dr. A. Subba Rao	Principal	2007	2009	
Sri M. Sanyasi	M.A	2009	2010	
Dr. R. Kanna Rao	M.Sc., PhD	2010	2013	
Dr. K. Parameswara Rao	M.Com., PhD	2013	2013	
Dr. Vedula Perraju	M.Sc., DTA	2013	2017	
Smt. Eranki Annapoorna	M.A., PhD	2017	2018	
Sri. D. Vjaya Prakash	M.Com., PhD	2018	2021	
Sri . C . Madhusudhan	M.A	2021	2021	
Sri . M.Simhadri Naidu	M.Com.,M.B.A.,UGC NET.,APSET	2022	2025	
Smt . P.Krishna Kumari	M.Sc(Organic Chemistry),(P.hd).,Rastra Bhasha Praveena(Hindi)	2026	Present	
