= Tiquadra circumdata =

Scientific classification
- Kingdom: Animalia
- Phylum: Arthropoda
- Clade: Pancrustacea
- Class: Insecta
- Order: Lepidoptera
- Family: Tineidae
- Genus: Tiquadra
- Species: T. circumdata

Binomial name
- Tiquadra circumdata (Zeller, 1877)

Synonyms
- Acureuta circumdata Zeller, 1877

Species of moth

Tiquadra circumdata is a moth of the family Tineidae. It is known from Colombia, where it is recorded in oil palm plantations.

The wingspan is about 25-30 mm.

Their larvae live inside a flattened case, which they make from palm fibers arranged with silks from their salivary glands. They are found in the shoots of palm trees older than two years, usually those affected by bud rot.
