= Tiquadra nucifraga =

Scientific classification
- Kingdom: Animalia
- Phylum: Arthropoda
- Class: Insecta
- Order: Lepidoptera
- Family: Tineidae
- Genus: Tiquadra
- Species: T. nucifraga

Binomial name
- Tiquadra nucifraga Meyrick, 1919

Species of moth

Tiquadra nucifraga is a moth of the family Tineidae. It is known from Colombia.

== Description ==
This species has a wingspan of about 33 millimetres (1.3 in). The forewings are light brownish strewn with coarse dark fuscous transverse strigulae sprinkled blackish. Irregular rather dark fuscous suffusion occupies most of antemedian area and forms large blotches on the costa beyond the middle and posterior halt of the dorsum. There is a small dark fuscous spot near before the apex. The hindwings are rather light fuscous.
