= Tiquadra albescens =

Scientific classification
- Kingdom: Animalia
- Phylum: Arthropoda
- Class: Insecta
- Order: Lepidoptera
- Family: Tineidae
- Genus: Tiquadra
- Species: T. albescens

Binomial name
- Tiquadra albescens (Diakonoff, 1968)

Synonyms
- Hapsifera albescens Diakonoff, 1968

Species of moth

Tiquadra albescens is a moth of the family Tineidae. It is known from the island of Luzon in the Philippines.

The wingspan of this species is about 17.5 mm. The forewings are creamy, the markings formed by purplish-black dusting. The costa has a slightly postmedian irregularly semioval spot, not reaching the cell and there is a roundish large dot on the costa before the apex, followed by two smaller dots, the ultimate preapical. There is also a series of very irregular spots and dots of diverse sizes along the dorsum, in the tornus and along the termen, as well as some two or three longitudinal marks along the base of the upper edge of the cell. The whole wing is strewn with blackish points, more numerous posteriorly and tending to form irregular spots, the largest well before the apex. The hindwings are pale greyish ochreous, finely strewn with pale fuscous, more densely so toward the apex and throughout with a faint purple gloss.
