= Tiquadra nivosa =

Scientific classification
- Kingdom: Animalia
- Phylum: Arthropoda
- Class: Insecta
- Order: Lepidoptera
- Family: Tineidae
- Genus: Tiquadra
- Species: T. nivosa

Binomial name
- Tiquadra nivosa (Felder, Felder & Rogenhofer, 1875)

Synonyms
- Scardia nivosa Felder & Rogenhofer, 1875

Species of moth

Tiquadra nivosa is a moth of the family Tineidae. It was described by Cajetan Felder, Rudolf Felder and Alois Friedrich Rogenhofer in 1875. It is known from Brazil.

== Hostplants ==
Its larvae were found in rotten stems of papaya (Carica papaya L.).
