= Tiquadra drapetica =

Scientific classification
- Kingdom: Animalia
- Phylum: Arthropoda
- Class: Insecta
- Order: Lepidoptera
- Family: Tineidae
- Genus: Tiquadra
- Species: T. drapetica

Binomial name
- Tiquadra drapetica Meyrick, 1919

Species of moth

Tiquadra drapetica is a moth of the family Tineidae. It is known from Brazil and Peru.

This species has a wingspan of 16–22 mm. The forewings are light greyish ochreous, more or less sprinkled fuscous, sometimes indicating obscure strigulae. There is a series of dark fuscous strigulae along the costa and around the apex. The stigmata are cloudy, rather dark fuscous, the plical rather obliquely before the first discal, an additional spot between the plical and the base. The hindwings are whitish ochreous, in females tinged grey posteriorly.
