= Kaliyuga Varadaraja Perumal Temple =

Hindu temple in Ariyalur

Religion
- Affiliation: Hinduism
- District: Ariyalur district of Tamil Nadu
- Deity: Vishnu

Location
- Location: Ariyalur district
- State: Tamil Nadu
- Country: India
- Interactive map of Kaliyuga Varadaraja Perumal Temple
- Coordinates: 11°08′57.8″N 79°07′12.5″E
- Elevation: 100 m (328 ft)

Kaliyuga Varadaraja Perumal Temple or Kaliyaperumal temple is a Hindu temple located at Kallankurichi in the Ariyalur district of Tamil Nadu, India. The temple is situated 10 km (6.2 mi) from Ariyalur and is dedicated to Perumal (Vishnu).

== Significance ==
The Presiding deity is about 8000 years old while the temple is approximately 500 years old, built by a cowherd on the spot of a 12-foot tall post believed to have miraculous powers. The post now forms the main deity in the temple. Nearby, the idol of Hanuman can be found.

== Presiding deity ==
There is no idol found as a presiding deity. Only a 12 feet tall post, a granite pillar, is found. Pujas are performed to this post. The temple has a majestic front with a few carvings. The Pillar of power is the presiding deity of the temple. The granite pillar is referred as 'Kambamperumal'. On the lower portion of the pillar Hanuman is carved out. It is a tiny figure. It appears to be in a state of firm self-control walks forward with the Sanjeevi hill on his left hand while the right hand is raised in a token of assurance. While going around the pillar within the sanctum, two carved figures, who found the temple 250 years back, can be seen. The processional deity, Varadharaja perumal can be worshipped in a large niche within the temple. Sreedevi and Boodevi are found in the temple. This temple is also known as Kaliyuga Varadaraja Perumal Temple.

== History ==
=== Sthala Puran ===
The Sthalapurana goes like, once a cow header, Maangan son of Gopalan who used to help the needy of his place, took out a herd of cows and found that one of his cows which was pregnant was missing on his return. Despite extensive search, he failed to locate the cow which was pregnant and neared the gestation period, leaving him dejected while returning home.

Three days later, he heard an divine voice from Lord Vishnu directing him to a particular place here in Kallankuruchi where he found the cow with her new born. Next day morning he went in search of the cow as he was directed in his dreams, he brought the mother and the new born to his home. Seven days later he heard the invisible voice again, this time telling him how great fool he was to leave a wooden pillar dedicated to Lord Vishnu which had immense powers worshiped by many.

When cow header went back to that place, he found a sacred pillar with the cow’s milk on it and immediately understood that it was none other than Lord Vishnu who had himself helped him the previous day. It was an accepted practice in olden days to erect the pillar as the deity and worship.

=== History of Pillar worship ===
According to the legend the main pillared deity is almost 8000 years old, there are many references in the Tamil literature of the Sangam era (500 BCE to the 300 CE), which mentions people worshiping pillars hence, this could have been one of those pillars worshiped by the sangam age people. Paṭṭiṉappālai is one of the finest sangam works which describes Pillar worships and also explains the paintings of Mahalakshmi on the fort walls of the city Kaveripoompatinam.

== Architecture ==
The temple houses some excellent Dravidian architecture of the Vijayanagara period. The temple has many pillars in the ardha mandapam which are sculpted in a beautiful manner and present throughout the temple as well. The sculptures and bas-reliefs depict various scenes from the Puranas. The Dasavathara mandapam has depiction of the Vishnu’s Dasavatharam. There are several sculptures throughout the temple which depict various legends of the Vaishnavate tradition.

== Offerings ==
The peasants bring portion of their promised offering here and pour them in the assigned vats. They are then measured and tied up in bags and placed in the rooms above, to be taken out and used later. There are large granaries. The devotees tie to the neck of a goat a note with the words 'Kaliyaperumal Kovil' and it would not get lost. Those who come across it will direct to move towards the temple of Kaliyaperumal near Ariyalur.

== Festival ==
Rama Navami is celebrated at the annual chariot festival, in which devotees come in large numbers to participate.
