= Kondapadumati =

Medieval dynasty in India

The Kondapadumati dynasty was a medieval Indian dynasty that ruled parts of present-day Andhra Pradesh. They governed the Kondapadumati or Sallapaschalya vishaya, a region located to the west of the Kondavidu range of hills—hence their name, with "Konda" meaning hill and "padumati" meaning west. This area corresponds to the eastern portion of the Sattenapalle Taluk in the Palnadu district. The dynasty's rule lasted for approximately one and a half centuries, with their capital established at Nadendla, near Chandole, the capital of the Velanati Chodas.

Initially, the Kondapadumatis served as subordinates to the Eastern Chalukyas and later pledged allegiance to the Chalukya Cholas, while maintaining friendly relations with the Velanati Cholas. They achieved significant military victories and formed marital alliances with the Velanati Chodas. The Kotas are considered a branch of the Kondapadumatis.

== Origin ==
The Kondapadumati dynasty was founded by Buddha Varma, who is recognized as its ancestor. Records indicate that Buddha Varma served Mukkanti Kaduvetti, the Pallava King, and was rewarded with the region of Omgerumargatraya. Later, Buddhavarman played a significant role in political affairs by assisting Kubja Vishnuvardhana (r. 624 – 641 CE) in conquering local giri (hill), vana (forest), and jala (water) forts. Kubja Vishnuvardhana appointed Buddha Varma as a subordinate, and Kondapadumati inscriptions compare his service to that of Hanuman's to Rama.

Buddha Varma was granted 73 villages west of the Kondavidu hills as a reward. Some sources suggest that Budda Varma received this land from Trinayana Pallava. While Kubja Vishnuvardhana established the kingdom of Vengi, Buddha Varma founded the Kondapadumati dynasty and became its first ruler. The Chebrolu inscription refers to the Kondapadumatis as the Chaturtha Kulas (Shudra).

After Buddha Varma, the dynasty was ruled by Manda I Ganda, Manda II Buddhiraju, Chodaraju, Manumanda III Malliraju, Manda IV Buddha IV, and Panda. The kingdom ultimately fell to the Kotas of Dhanyakataka and later became subordinate to the Kakatiyas.
