= Tiquadra pontifica =

Scientific classification
- Kingdom: Animalia
- Phylum: Arthropoda
- Class: Insecta
- Order: Lepidoptera
- Family: Tineidae
- Genus: Tiquadra
- Species: T. pontifica

Binomial name
- Tiquadra pontifica Meyrick, 1919

Species of moth

Tiquadra pontifica is a moth of the family Tineidae. It is known from French Guiana

This species has a wingspan of about 22 mm. The forewings are whitish grey, the markings dark grey mixed with blackish. There is a mark on the base of the costa and a transverse fascia of irregular strigulation or marbling at one-third, where a bar runs below the middle to the base, and another bar in the middle to a large irregular patch of similar marbling occupying nearly the apical third of the wing and partially suffused brownish. The hindwings are dark grey.
