= Tiquadra crocidura =

Scientific classification
- Kingdom: Animalia
- Phylum: Arthropoda
- Class: Insecta
- Order: Lepidoptera
- Family: Tineidae
- Genus: Tiquadra
- Species: T. crocidura

Binomial name
- Tiquadra crocidura Meyrick, 1922

Species of moth

Tiquadra crocidura is a moth of the family Tineidae. It is known from Santa Catarina, Brazil.

The wingspan is about 38 mm. The forewings are white, slightly speckled dark fuscous towards the costa and posteriorly. There are three or four indistinct strigulae (fine streaks) of dark fuscous speckling on the costa anteriorly. The hindwings are pale whitish yellowish, with some slight grey speckling posteriorly.
