= Tiquadra nubilella =

Scientific classification
- Kingdom: Animalia
- Phylum: Arthropoda
- Class: Insecta
- Order: Lepidoptera
- Family: Tineidae
- Genus: Tiquadra
- Species: T. nubilella

Binomial name
- Tiquadra nubilella Amsel, 1956

Species of moth

Tiquadra nubilella is a moth of the family Tineidae. It is known from Colombia and Venezuela, where it is recorded in oil palm plantations.
