= Tiquadra cultrifera =

Scientific classification
- Kingdom: Animalia
- Phylum: Arthropoda
- Class: Insecta
- Order: Lepidoptera
- Family: Tineidae
- Genus: Tiquadra
- Species: T. cultrifera

Binomial name
- Tiquadra cultrifera Meyrick, 1914

Species of moth

Tiquadra cultrifera is a moth of the family Tineidae. It is known from Benin, Democratic Republic of the Congo, Ghana and Nigeria.

The wingspan is 21–28 mm. The forewings are white or ochreous-whitish, with scattered dots or strigulae (lines) of dark fuscous irroration (speckling) except beneath the fold. There are some small raised tufts along the fold, and in the disc posteriorly. The hindwings are whitish-ochreous tinged with grey in males and grey in females. This species is unmistakable by its whitish green or bluish basic colour.
