= Tiquadra etiennei =

Scientific classification
- Kingdom: Animalia
- Phylum: Arthropoda
- Clade: Pancrustacea
- Class: Insecta
- Order: Lepidoptera
- Family: Tineidae
- Genus: Tiquadra
- Species: T. etiennei

Binomial name
- Tiquadra etiennei Viette, 1988

Species of moth

Tiquadra etiennei is a moth of the family Tineidae. It is endemic to Réunion island in the Indian Ocean.

== See also ==
- List of moths of Réunion
