= Tiquadra vilis =

Scientific classification
- Kingdom: Animalia
- Phylum: Arthropoda
- Class: Insecta
- Order: Lepidoptera
- Family: Tineidae
- Genus: Tiquadra
- Species: T. vilis

Binomial name
- Tiquadra vilis Meyrick, 1922

Synonyms
- Tiquadra coracophila Meyrick, 1932

Species of moth

Tiquadra vilis is a moth of the family Tineidae. It is known from Brazil and Argentina.

This species has a wingspan of 17–21 mm.
