= Palkuriki Somanatha =

12th century Telugu, Kannada and Sanskrit writer

Palkurike Somanatha was a poet in Telugu, Kannada and Sanskrit languages and penned several classics in those languages. He was a Aradhya Brahmin a follower of the 12th century social reformer Basavanna and his writings were primarily intended to propagate this faith. He was a well acclaimed Shaiva poet. The trio of Nanne Choda, Mallikarjuna Panditaradhya and Palkuriki Somanatha are referred as Śivakavitrayam (i.e. Trio of Saivite Poets). These trio along with Piduparthi poets and Yathavakkula Annamayya pioneered Veera Saiva movement in Andhra region.

== Life ==
Indication that he was not a Shaiva by birth comes from the fact that he mentions the names of his parents in his very first work, Basava Purana, as Visnuramideva and Sriyadevi, violating a general practice of Shaiva writers who do not mention their real parents but rather consider the god Shiva as the father and his consort Parvati as the mother. However, the scholar Bandaru Tammayya has argued that he was born a Jangama (devotee of the god Shiva). The scholar Seshayya places him in the late 13th to early 14th century and proposes that the writer lived during the reign of Kakatiya king Prataparudra II, whereas the Kannada scholar R. Narasimhacharya dates his writings to the 12th century and claims Somanatha was patronised by Kakatiya king Prataparudra I (1140–1196). His place of birth is uncertain because there is a village by the name Palkuriki in the Warangal district of the Telangana state as well as in the Kannada speaking region (Karnataka). He spent his last days in Karnataka in a village called Kalya located in Magadi Taluk of Ramanagara district in Karnataka, the story goes that Palkuriki Somanatha upon wanting to see the devout nun Sarvashile Chennamma who was residing in Kalya, came to the village and upon the latter's request stayed back in the same village until his death, his gaddige (tomb) is located in the village and is worshipped by the devout to this day, this information is recorded in the biography of Palkuriki Somanatha published by the Sahitya Akamdemi.

== Writings ==
Telugu language

Important among his Telugu language writings are the Basava Purana, Panditaradhya charitra, Malamadevipuranamu and Somanatha Stava–in dwipada metre ("couplets"); Anubhavasara, Chennamallu Sisamalu, Vrushadhipa Saataka and Cheturvedasara–in verses; Basavodharana in verses and ragale metre (rhymed couplets in blank verse); and the Basavaragada.

Kannada language

His contributions to Kannada literature are, the Basavaragada, Basavadhyaragada, Sadgururagada, Silasampadane, Sahasragananama, Pancharantna. Several Vachana and ragale poems are also his contributions to Kannada literature. Somanatha's Telugu Basavapurana was the inspiration for Vijayanagara poet Bhimakavi (c. 1369) who wrote a Kannada book by the same name. Somanatha was the protagonist of a 16th-century Kannada purana ("epic religious text") written by the Vijayanagara poet Tontadarya.

Sanskrit language

Important among his Sanskrit language writings are the Somanathabhashya, Rudrabhashya, Vrushabhastaka, Basavodharana, Basavashtaka, Basava panchaka, Ashtottara satanama gadya, Panchaprakara gadya and Asharanka gadya.

== Works in translation ==
- Siva's Warriors: The Basava Purana of Palkuriki Somanatha, Tr. by Velcheru Narayana Rao. Princeton Univ Press, 1990. ISBN 0691055912.

== See also ==
Web page on Palkuriki Somanatha

https://en.wikipedia.org/wiki/Madivala_Machideva
