= Rajendra Choda II =

Velanati Chodas
Durjaya Chieftains of Velanadu
- Gonka I: 1076–1108
- Rajendra Choda I: 1108–1132
- Gonka II: 1132–1161
- Rajendra Choda II: 1161–1181
- Gonka III: 1181–1186
- Pruthviswara: 1186–1207
- Rajendra Choda III: 1207–1216

Rajendra Chola II was a king and the fourth of Velanati Chodas who ruled from 1161 to 1181 AD.

He succeeded his father Gonka II and his reign was full of rebellions from Nellore Chodas, Pottapi Chodas and Pakanadu Chodas. He lost to Rudradeva of Kakatiyas. Their kingdom weakened during his period.

Preceded by Gonka II	Velanati Chodas; 1181–1186	Succeeded by Gonka III
