= Gonka II =

Indian chieftain (fl. 1132–1161)

Velanati Chodas
Durjaya Chieftains of Velanadu
- Gonka I: 1076–1108
- Rajendra Choda I: 1108–1132
- Gonka II: 1132–1161
- Rajendra Choda II: 1161–1181
- Gonka III: 1181–1186
- Pruthviswara: 1186–1207
- Rajendra Choda III: 1207–1216

Gonka II was a Telugu king and the third of Velanati Chodas who ruled from 1132 to 1161.

Gonka II succeeded his father Rajendra Choda I. He was regarded as greatest among of all Chodas and also fought as general in earlier battles during his father reign. He accompanied Kulottunga II in many battles like famous Godavari battle that resulted in recovering all regions from Kalyani Chalukyas. He crushed many rebel chieftains like Nellore Chodas and Konidena Chodas. His kingdom included the region between Mahendragiri in north and Srisailam in south. Prola II of Kakatiyas attacked his kingdom in 1158. Chodayaraja, chief of Gonaka II killed Prola II and annexed lost regions. Gonaka II assumed many titles like Chalukyarajya MulaStambha.

Preceded by Rajendra Choda I	Velanati Chodas; 1132 –1161	Succeeded by Rajendra Choda II
