= Gonka III =

Velanati Chodas
Durjaya Chieftains of Velanadu
- Gonka I: 1076–1108
- Rajendra Choda I: 1108–1132
- Gonka II: 1132–1161
- Rajendra Choda II: 1161–1181
- Gonka III: 1181–1186
- Pruthviswara: 1186–1207
- Rajendra Choda III: 1207–1216

Gonka III was a Telugu king and the fifth of Velanati Chodas who ruled from 1181 to 1186.

He succeeded his father Rajendra Choda II and he lost to Rudradeva II of Kakatiya and also to his rebel Kota Chieftain Ketaraja II. He was killed in 1186 in a battle with the Kakatiyas. Velanadu chiefs lost their capital and most parts of the Velanadu kingdom.

Preceded by Rajendra Choda II	Velanati Chodas; 1181–1186	Succeeded by Prithviswara
