= Paṭṭiṉappālai =

Ancient Tamil poem in Sangam literature

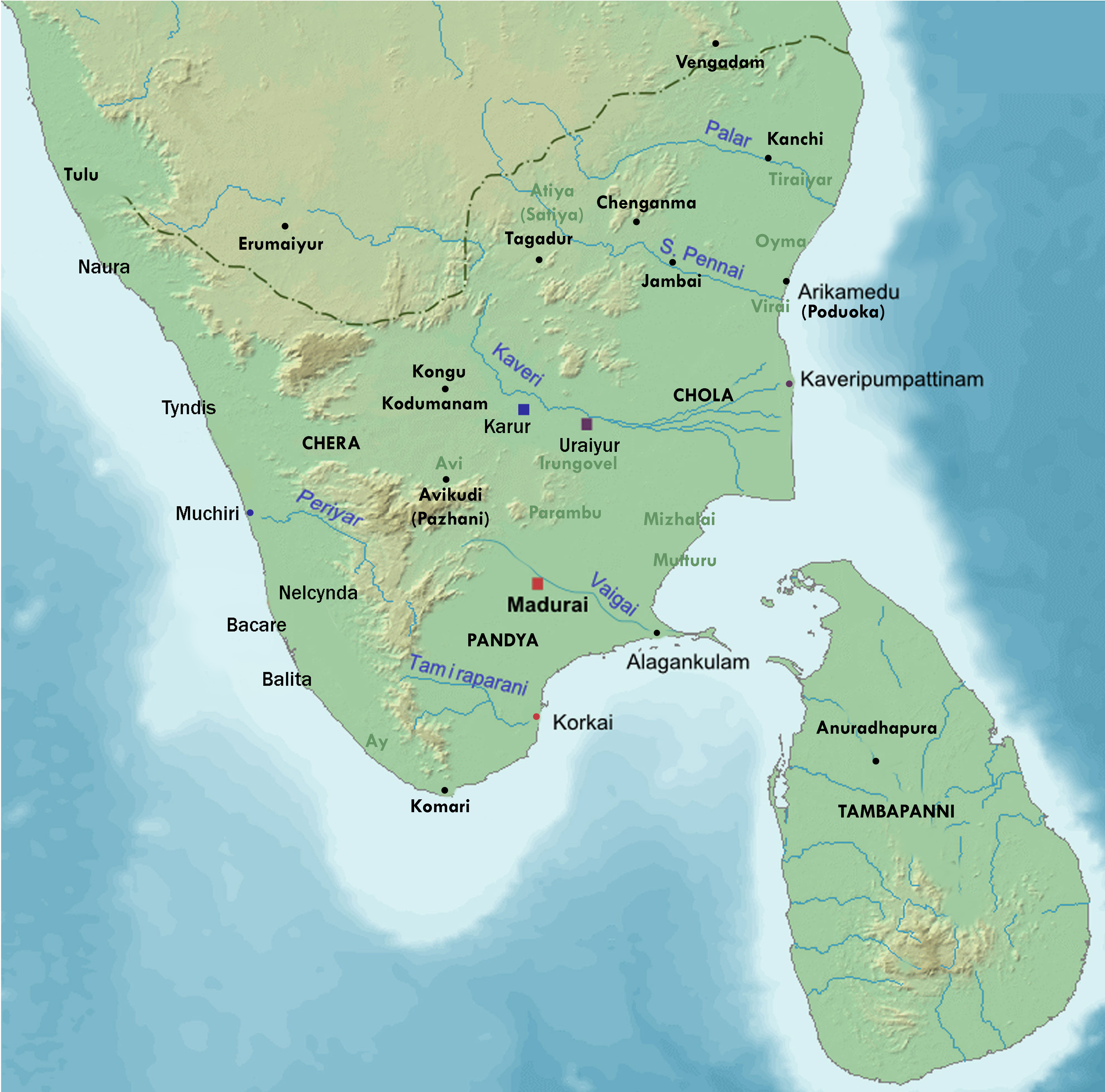
The Pattinappalai describes the Kaveripumpattinam and Chola kingdom in the above map.

Paṭṭiṉappālai (Tamil: பட்டினப் பாலை) is a Tamil poem in the ancient Sangam literature. It contains 301 lines, of which 296 lines are about the port city of Kaveripoompattinam, the early Chola kingdom and the Chola king Karikalan. The remaining 5 lines are on the proposed separation by a man who wants to move there and the separation pain of his wife who would miss her husband's love. Of the 301 lines, 153 are in the vanci meter and the rest are in akaval. It is sometimes referred to as Vancinetumpattu, or the "long song in the vanci meter". The poem was composed by Katiyalur Uruttirankannanar, sometime around 1st century and 2nd century CE, states Kamil Zvelebil – a Tamil literature scholar. There are mentions of Mahalakshmi painted on walls and considered her as the goddess of fortune and wealth. The poem explains that the high and strong walls of the city secure the king where Mahalakshmi sits enthroned. There are mentions in Paṭṭiṉappālai that many Tamilians worshiped tall pillars or posts as Mayon (Vishnu). There are Many mentions of Maha Vishnu throughout the poem. There are temples present even now, where Maha Vishnu is worshiped in a pillar form. A well known example is the Kaliyuga Varadaraja Perumal Temple. It mentions the worship of Maha Vishnu, Mahalakshmi and Murugan. Muruga was worshiped as the red god and the god of war.

The title Pattinappalai is combination of two words, pattinam (city) and palai (desert, metonymically "separation, love division"). The poem has a lengthy initial section on the harbor capital city of the ancient Cholas, Kaveripattinam, also referred to as Kavirippattinam, Kaveripumpattinam, Pugar, Puhar, or Kakanthi. This section contains a vivid description of a busy maritime coastal city, the big ships, the fishermen, the markets, its festivals and feasts, and the people. The lines about the lover's separation appear in lines 261–264 and lines 379–382. Between these, is the description of the generous Chola king and the kingdom. The husband is so moved by his wife's inconsolable pain that he postpones his move.

The poem is an important and rich source of historical information about the ancient Chola kingdom and its capital city. The Pattinappalai mentions the city's music and dance traditions, cock and ram fights, the thriving alcohol and fisheries business, the overseas and domestic trade among the Indian peninsular port cities. There is a mention of goods coming from Burma, Ceylon, northern India, and the River Ganges valley. The section on the Chola king describe the king's initial struggles to gain his throne because neighboring kingdoms had invaded the Chola territory when he was a child. The poem then describes the wars he won, the slaves he took, his return to the throne, his generosity to his people, the artists and the bards.

The Pattinappalai gives a window into the ethical premises that were idealised by the ancient Tamil society in the Chola kingdom. The peaceful lives of the people is thus described, according to JV Chellaih:

Quite free and happy are their lives
Amidst their multiplying kin
They know no foes; the fishes play
Near the fishers' quarters unafraid,
And cattle multiply untouched
In butchers haunts.
The merchants thus
Condemn the taking of these lives,
They tolerate not thieving vile,
They do their duties by the gods,
Oblations offer, tend with care
Fine bulls and cows, exalt the priests
That teach the Vedas four, they give
Their guests food cooked and uncooked too
Unstintingly they dispense alms
And live a life of gracious love

— Pattinappalai 227–241

For the merchants plying their trade, some of the lines in this poem state:

They speak the truth and deem it shame
To lie. For others' good they have
The same regard as for their own
In trade. Nor do they try to get
Too much in selling their own goods
Nor give too little when they buy
They set a fair price on all things.

— Pattinappalai 245–251

The borders of the city with great fame
are protected by the celestials. Swift
horses with lifted heads arrive on ships
from abroad, sacks of black pepper arrive
from inland by wagons, gold comes from
northern mountains, sandalwood and akil
wood come from the western mountains,
and materials come from the Ganges.

The yields of river Kāviri, food items from
Eelam, products made in Burma (Kedah), and many
rare and big things are piled up together on
the wide streets, bending the land under.

— Pattinappalai 183-193

This ancient poem regained popularity during 9th to 12th century CE, the later Chola empire, when the court poets used it glorify the ancient heritage and success of the dynasty centuries ago. It is quoted in Tamil literature and temple inscriptions composed during the 11th and 12th century. The Pattinappalai is notable for its mention of the early Chola kingdom as a cosmopolitan region, where Hindu and Jain monasteries and communities co-existed.

According to scholars such as Miksic, Yian, Meenakshisundararajan and others, the Pattinappalai is an early textual evidence of the significance of overseas trade that economically and culturally linked Tamil regions with southeast Asian communities in Indonesia, Thailand and Malaysia. One of the trade destinations "Kadaram" in this poem has long been proposed to be the same as modern Kedah in Malaysia, starting with the proposal of K A Nilakanta Sastri in his History of Sri Vijaya. The poem is also an early record attesting to the cultural practice of dedicating memorial Hero stones in South India (lines 88–89).

== See also ==
- Eighteen Greater Texts
- Sangam literature
