= Nanne Choda =

Telugu poet

An artist’s rendition of Nanne Choda

Nanne Choda (Telugu: నన్నె చోడుడు) was a 12th-century Telugu poet renowned for composing the famous work Kumara Sambhavam. He holds the titles Tekanadityudu (టెంకాణాదిత్యుడు) and Kaviraja Sikhamani (కవిరాజ శిఖామణి). He is regarded as the first composer of Prabandha. The trio of Nanne Choda, Mallikarjuna Panditaradhya and Palkuriki Somanatha are referred as Śivakavitrayam (i.e. Trio of Saivite Poets). These trio along with Piduparthi poets and Yathavakkula Annamayya pioneered the Veera Saiva movement in the Andhra region.

== Dating ==
The exact timeline of Nannechoda's life is debated in Telugu literary circles. Chilukuri Veerabhadra Rao suggested that he lived between 925 and 940 CE. He based this on a particular verse, indicating that Telugu poetry flourished a hundred years before Nannaya. However, due to various interpretations of that verse and the uncertainty regarding its authenticity, Veturi Prabhakara Sastry concluded that it is difficult to prove Nannechoda's antiquity compared to Nannaya. The similarity between verses in Somnatha's 12th-century works and Nannechoda's Kumara Sambhavam has led scholars to believe they might have lived around the same period.

== Biography ==
In his works, he claims that his mother was from Haihaya family of Palanadu, chieftains to Velanati Chodas. He dedicated his work to Jangama Mallikarjuna Yogi, a Shaivite saint.

== Works ==
Nanne Choda's famous work is Kumara Sambhavam in Telugu. Some believe that this work was composed in the 10th century before Nannaya's Mahabaratha. Others place Nannechoda between the periods of Nannaya and Tikkana. Kumara Sambhavam is not the translation of Kalidasa's work of the same name. But Nannechodudu has drawn inspiration from Kalidasa's work as well as other stories of the Saivaite literature. Nannechoda's Kumara Sambhavam is not a literal translation of Kalidasa's work but an original prabandha that draws on various Puranic sources. His work demonstrates a blend of classical and local traditions, highlighting his skill in adapting stories for the Telugu literary landscape. He has dedicated his work to Jangama Mallikarjuna, who was his guru.

== Style ==
He was the first writer in the Prabandha style and earlier than Srinatha and Ashtadiggajas. He had used a mixture of Sanskrit and Telugu words. He was a master of Telugu idioms. Some of his poems describing nature are very popular. He had introduced new aspects in Telugu literature. He had written poems that do Sukavi Stuti (praise of good poets), Kukavi Ninda (blame the bad poets) and Ishtadeva Prardhana (praise of favourite god) in his works. He believed that poetry should be aesthetically pleasing and emotionally resonant, and he emphasized the importance of each verse being distinctive and impactful.

Nanne Choda is credited with the early integration of Kannada and Tamil words into Telugu poetry, showcasing his innovative approach to language and literary expression.

== See also ==
- Nannaya
- Tikkana
