= Keyura-bahu-charitramu =

Collection of short stories by Manchana

- Author: Manchana
- Original title: కేయూరబాహుచరిత్ర
- Language: Telugu
- Subject: Poetic collection of short stories
- Genre: Prabandha
- Publication place: Velanati Choda kingdom (present-day India)

Keyura-bahu-charitramu (IAST: Keyūra-bāhu-caritramu) is a Telugu language poetic collection of short stories written by Manchana in the Velanati Choda kingdom of southern India in the 12th or the 13th century. The book's title is also transliterated as Keyura-bahu-charitra (IAST: Keyūra-bāhu-caritra) or Keyura-bahu-charitram.

== Authorship ==
The poet Manchana (IAST: Mañcana) lived in the Velanati Choda kingdom of southern India, probably during late 12th to early 13th century CE.

== Contents ==
The book contains several short stories (kathas) within a frame narrative. Manchana took the frame story from Rajashekhara's Viddha-shalabhanjika, and took the short stories from several other sources including Pancha-tantra. His writings are an example of the early Prabandha style, and the earliest extant example of the katha (story) narrative in the Telugu literature.

Manchana dedicated the book to Nanduri Gundayamatya, a grandson of the Velanati Choda courtier Nanduri Ketana. The book glorifies generals, diplomats, and ministers of the Velanati Choda king Gonka II.
