= Gonka I =

Velanati Chodas
Durjaya Chieftains of Velanadu
- Gonka I: 1076–1108
- Rajendra Choda I: 1108–1132
- Gonka II: 1132–1161
- Rajendra Choda II: 1161–1181
- Gonka III: 1181–1186
- Pruthviswara: 1186–1207
- Rajendra Choda III: 1207–1216

Gonka I was a Telugu king and the first of Velanati Chodas who ruled from 1076 to 1108.

Gonka I ruled as a vassal to Kulottunga I of Later Cholas of Gangaikonda Cholapuram, and his son Mammadi Varma, viceroy of Vengi. He fought as general in the battles against Kalyani Chalukyas and also against refractory vassals, Kalinga and Chakrakuta, who joined with Kalyani Chalukyas. He assumed the title Chalukyarajya- Mula Stambha. His kingdom included the region from Gundlakamma in south to Tripurantakam in West.He was also a commander-in- chief of the army.

Preceded by	Velanati Chodas; 1076 –1108	Succeeded by Rajendra Choda I
