= Vijaya Gandagopala =

King of Nellore Chodas

Vijaya Ganda Gopalan was a king of Nellore Chodas who ruled over Southern Andhra and Kanchipuram from 1248 to 1263 CE. He was ruling along with his brothers Manumasiddha III and Allutikka.

== Life ==
His full name, as it appears in inscriptions, is 'Tribhuvanachakravarthi Vijayagandagopaladeva'. He called himself 'Lord of Kanchi'. His rule began in 1250 CE as an independent king. His kingdom witnessed crucial developments during 1250–1291. Kanchi changed hands in rapid succession among Telugu Chodas, Kakatiyas, Kadava Kopperunchinga and the Pandyas. The change of rule often meant only the de jure change of the overlords. He remained as the local chieftain of Kanchi. His reign was coeval with Rajendra III, Jatavarman Sundara Pandya I, Kopperunchinga and Kakatiya Ganapathi.

He issued his own regnal system between 1253 and 1291, which are found in the Varadaraja Swami Temple. This long rule was interrupted by intrusions. For example, Kopperunchinga II is recognized as King of Kanchi from 1253–1254 AD, again in May 1257 and again in 1260. In the same years, Vijaya Gandagopala is also recognized as ruler of Kanchi. This shows the rapid changes in political fortunes of Kanchi and that at one time, rival kings were only supported by their adherents.

In 1260 AD, Jatavarman Sundara Pandyan I overran Vijaya Gandagopala Territory and marched as far as Nellore where he performed 'Virabhisheka'. He anointed himself as king of Kanchi.
