= Velanati Chodas =

Medieval Andhra dynasty

Velanati Durjayas
- 1076–1216
- Capital: Chandole, Velanadu
- Language: Telugu
- Religion: Hinduism
- Government: Monarchy
- History
  - Established: 1076
  - Disestablished: 1216

The Velanati Chodas, also known as the Velanati Durjayas and Velanadu chiefs, were a Telugu dynasty that ruled parts of Andhra Pradesh during the 12th century. They served as tributaries to the Later Cholas and the Western Chalukyas, governing the region of Kammanadu in the erstwhile Guntur district.

At the height of their power, the Velanati Chodas ruled over Venginadu, located between the Krishna and Godavari rivers. They were Telugu speakers and claimed descent from Durjaya, a legendary chieftain of ancient Andhra, earning them the title of Durjayas of Velanadu. Rajendra Choda II, one of their rulers, assumed the title "Durjayakulaprakasa." As they owed allegiance to the Later Cholas, they added "Choda" to their names as an honorific.

== History ==
Gonka I ruled as a vassal to Kulothunga I of the Later Cholas in Gangaikonda Cholapuram, and his son Mummadi Varma served as viceroy of Vengi. He fought as a general in battles against the Kalyani Chalukyas and rebellious vassals, Kalinga and Chakrakuta, who allied with the Kalyani Chalukyas. Mummadi Varma assumed the title Chola Mula Stambha (The pillar of Chola empire). His kingdom encompassed the region from Gundlakamma in the south to Tripurantakam in the west. Rajendra Choda I succeeded his father as chieftain, maintaining allegiance to the Later Cholas. He was defeated by Anantapalaya, a general of Vikramaditya VI of the Kalyani Chalukyas in 1115 AD and was forced to accept their suzerainty.

Someswara III succeeded his father Vikramaditya VI in Kalyani in 1126 AD, while Rajendra Choda I continued his allegiance to the Kalyani Chalukyas. Malla Bhupati of Vengi recovered some regions along the banks of the Krishna, but the Velanati Chodas remained subjects of Someswara III during these conflicts. However, in 1132 AD, Rajendra Choda I fought alongside the Later Cholas. Vikrama Chola dispatched his army, led by his son Kulothunga II, to Vengi. Many chieftains, including the Velanati Chodas, collaborated with him and played a crucial role in driving out the Kalyani Chalukyas in the Battle of Manneru.

Rajendra Choda I died in the same year, and Gonka II succeeded him. He was regarded as the greatest among all Chodas and served as a general in earlier battles during his father's reign. He accompanied Kulothunga Chola II in numerous campaigns, including the famous Godavari battle, which resulted in the recovery of all territories from the Kalyani Chalukyas. He defeated several rebellious chieftains, such as the Chodas of Nellore and Konidena. His kingdom extended from Mahendragiri in the north to Srisailam in the south. Prola II of the Kakatiyas attacked his kingdom in 1158 AD, but Chodayaraja, chief of Gonaka II, killed Prola II and annexed the lost territories. Gonaka II assumed several titles, including Chalukyarajya MulaStambha.

== Social Mobility and Kshatriya Claims ==
Many minor ruling dynasties of medieval Andhradesa, including the Velanandu-Cholas, Kondapadumatis, Kotas, Natavadis, and Kandravadis, were originally of Shudra varna. As these rulers gained political power and economic strength, they increasingly identified themselves as Kshatriyas. To reinforce their claimed status, they incorporated mythical and semi-mythical figures such as Durjaya, Ikshvaku, and Rama into their genealogical narratives. This practice reflected a broader Brahmanical tendency to absorb influential lower-caste rulers into the Kshatriya fold by adapting traditional genealogies, thereby preserving the stability of the existing social hierarchy. Even subordinate chiefs, while remaining within the Shudra fold, often imitated this strategy in their inscriptions.

== Decline ==
The glory of the Velanati Chodas persisted during the reigns of their subsequent rulers, Rajendra Choda II and Gonka III. Although they triumphed over rebellions from the north and west, they lost control of some regions. Many warriors were slain in the Battle of Palanadu between the Haihayas, relatives, and vassals of the Velanati Chodas. The kingdom lost land from Srisailam to Tripurantakam to the Kakatiya king Rudradeva.

The last significant king of the dynasty was Pruthviswara, who ruled from Pithapuram. He made several attempts to regain lost territories and prestige. During the Kakatiyas' conflict with the Yadavas, he managed to recover Velanadu. However, starting from 1201 AD, he suffered defeats against the Kakatiyas and their subjects, the Nellore Chodas, and was slain in battle with Ganapatideva of the Kakatiyas in 1207 AD. His son, Rajendra Choda III, made further attempts but ultimately lost the entire kingdom to Ganapatideva.

== Rulers ==
- Gonka I (1076–1108)
- Rajendra Choda I (1108–1132)
- Gonka II (1132–1161)
- Rajendra Choda II (1161–1181)
- Gonka III (1181–1186)
- Pruthviswara (1186–1207)
- Rajendra Choda III (1207–1216)

== Culture ==
The Velanati Chodas ruled over a region between the Krishna and Godavari rivers. According to Keyurabahu Charitram, the region experienced prosperity and abundance. The Palanati Charitra mentions that war sports, including cockfighting, were popular, and the region boasted opulent city markets.

Nanne Choda, a renowned Telugu poet, hailed from this dynasty.

== Religion ==
During this period, the region witnessed both Saivism and Vaishnavism. The kings practiced Saivism, as documented in historical texts about the Velanati kings.
