= Rajendra Choda I =

Chieftain of the Velanati Chodas from 1108 to 1132

Chieftain of the Velanati Chodas
- Reign: 1108–1132
- Predecessor: Gonka I
- Successor: Gonka II

Velanati Chodas
Durjaya Chieftains of Velanadu
- Gonka I: 1076–1108
- Rajendra Choda I: 1108–1132
- Gonka II: 1132–1161
- Rajendra Choda II: 1161–1181
- Gonka III: 1181–1186
- Pruthviswara: 1186–1207
- Rajendra Choda III: 1207–1216

Rajendra Choda I was a Telugu king and the second of Velanati Cholas who ruled from 1108 to 1132.

Rajendra Choda I succeeded his father Gonka I as the commander-in-chief and continued his allegiance to the Chola dynasty. He was defeated by Anantapalaya, the general of Vikramaditya VI of Kalyani Chalukyas in 1115 during Kalinga expedition. Rajendra Choda I was forced to accept the suzerainty of Vikramaditya VI of Kalyani Chalukyas between 1115 and 1126. The Kalyani Chalukyas continued their victory and started winning most of the Telugu country including Bezawada, Kondapalli and Jananatapura and they marched till Kanchi and ransacked it.

Someswara III (r. 1126–1138) succeeded his father Vikramaditya VI in Kalyani in 1126 and Rajendra Choda I continued their allegiance to Kalyani Chalukyas. Malla Bhupati of Vengi recovered some regions on the banks of Krishna, but Velanti Chodas remained as subjects of Someswara II in these battles. However, in 1132, he fought alongside the Chola dynasty. Vikrama Chola sent his army under his son Kulottunga II to Vengi. Many chieftains including Velandu Chodas joined hands with him and helped in driving out Kalyani Chalukyas in the battle of Manneru.

Preceded by Gonka I	Velanati Chodas; 1108 –1132	Succeeded by Gonka II
