= P. T. Srinivasa Iyengar =

Indian historian, linguist and educationist (1863–1931)

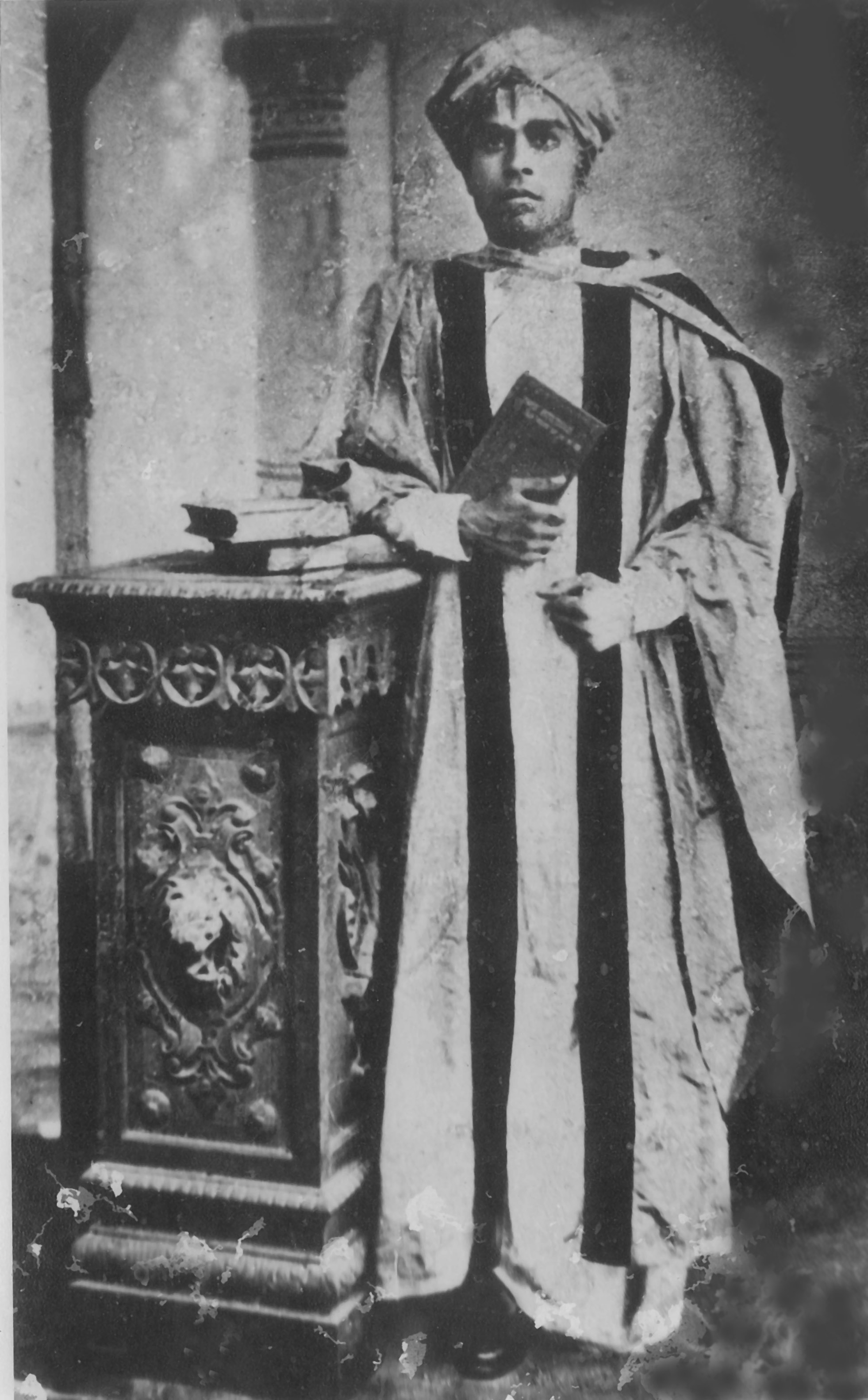
P. T. Srinivasa Iyengar

Pillaipundagudi Thiruvengadattaiyangar Srinivasa Iyengar (1863–1931) was an Indian historian, linguist and educationist who wrote books on the history of South India.

== Academic career ==
Srinivasa Iyengar served as the principal of A. V. N. College, Visakhapatnam during the first two decades of the twentieth century. He campaigned to bring changes in the curriculum and introduce spoken dialects. In 1909, he created a Telugu teaching Reform society in order to cultivate vernacular Telugu. In 1911, Iyengar published a textbook of arithmetic called Longman's Arithmethikkulu in modern Telugu. In April 1913, when Madras University appointed a committee to examine and advise them on the style to be adopted for the Telugu composition of the Intermediate Course which replaced the earlier F. A. Iyengar was appointed one of the ten members.

He was serving as principal and professor of English at Rajahmundry Training College, when he was appointed reader of Indian history and archaeology with fellow Indologists S. Krishnaswami Aiyangar and V. R. Ramachandra Dikshitar as the sole professor and lecturer respectively. He served as reader till his death in 1931.

== Books ==
- Iyengar, P. T. Srinivasa (1909). Outlines of Indian philosophy. Theosophical Publishing House.
- Iyengar, P. T. Srinivasa (1909). Death Or Life: A Plea for the Vernaculars.
- Iyengar, P. T. Srinivasa (1912). History of the Indian people. Life in ancient India in the age of the mantras. Srinivasa Vadarachari & Co.
- Kshemaraja (translated by P. T. Srinivasa Iyengar) (1912). The Shiva-sutra-vimarsinī of Ksemaraja. Editors, Indian Thought.
- Iyengar, P. T. Srinivasa (1912). Gayathri. Higginbotham & Co.
- Iyengar, P. T. Srinivasa. The Stone Age in India.
- Iyengar, P. T. Srinivasa. Pre-Aryan Tamil Culture.
- Daniel, S. G.; P. T. Srinivasa Iyengar. First Steps in Tamil.
- Iyengar, P. T. Srinivasa (1929). History of the Tamils from the Earliest Times to the Present Day.
- Willatt, John; P. T. Srinivasa Iyengar (1929). A Short History of India. Oxford University Press.
- Iyengar, P. T. Srinivasa (1931). Bhoja Raja. Methodist Publishing House.
- Iyengar, P. T. Srinivasa (1942). Advanced History of India. Hindi Prachar Press.
