= Perumpāṇāṟṟuppaṭai =

Ancient Tamil poem

- by Uruttirankannanar
- Original title: பெரும்பாணாற்றுப்படை
- Written: 190–200 CE
- Language: Tamil

Perumpāṇāṟṟuppaṭai (Tamil: பெரும்பாணாற்றுப்படை, lit. 'guide for bards with the large lute') is an ancient Tamil poem in the Pattuppattu anthology of the Sangam literature. It contains 500 lines in the akaval meter. It is one of five arruppatai genre poems and was a guide to other bards seeking a patron for their art. Set as a praise for chieftain Tonataiman Ilantiraiyan of the Kanchi territory, it was composed by Uruttirankannanar sometime around 190–200 CE, states Kamil Zvelebil – a Tamil literature scholar. While the poem is from the 2nd century, it was likely added to the Pattuppāṭṭu anthology in the 4th or 5th century CE, states Dennis Hudson – an Indologist and World Religions scholar. The poem has Several Mentions Of Vishnu and his temples present in Kanchipuram, It also refers to Vishnu as the supreme god of the world and Brahma was born from the navel of Vishnu.

The Perumpāṇāṟṟuppaṭai poem, also referred to as Perumpanattrupadai, is named after perumpanar – a class of minstrels who sang their bards while playing a large lute. The poem provides a detailed description of the five tinai (landscapes) of Kanchi territory: mountainous (kurinci), forested (palai), pastoral (mullai), farmlands (marutam), coastal (neytal). The capital city of Kanchipuram is described as a city of ancient might, fame, prosperity and abounding in religious festivals.

The poem is a source of cultural and sociological information about ancient Kanchipuram and nearby regions, along with the government and economic systems under Tamil chieftains. Of sociological interest are the distinctive lifestyles of robbers who are described in Perumpanattrupadai as living in fortified villages, while the lifestyle of hunters, fishermen, farmers, and herdsmen are described to be different. The poem mentions Neerpayattu as a thriving seaport, the city of Kanchi as having suburbs, the ruler as someone generous to the bards. The chieftain Ilantiraiyan is of historic importance since he is mentioned in other Sangam literature, such as in Purananuru and Natrinai, as well as described as a poet that adds to his own fame.

In the cultural context, the poem mentions a yupa post (a form of Vedic altar) and a Brahmin village. Vedas are recited by these Brahmins, and even their parrots are mentioned in the poem as those who sing the Vedic hymns. People in these Vedic villages did not eat meat, nor raise fowls. They ate rice, salad leaves boiled in ghee, pickles and vegetables. Elsewhere, the hunters are described as meat-eaters, herdsmen relied on milk, yoghurt and ghee, fishermen ate a variety of fish, while farmers ate the meat of domestic fowl, beans, fruits and farm produce. Rice was a staple in all landscapes. Rice was also a major part of any offerings to the gods in temples and on festivals, according to several lines in the poem, such as over lines 267–269.

The Perumpanattrupadai mentions Maha Vishnu and describes him as the god who is "tall, dark-skinned", the supreme god from whom "the four-faced god was born" (a Vedic legend about Brahma being born from Vishnu's navel). In its similes, it mentions the Ganges river, the Pandavas of the Mahabharata, and the Yoga adept rishis (sages). According to Hudson, the poem is notable that it explicitly mentions three temples of Maha Vishnu namely Ulagalantha Perumal Temple, Kanchipuram, Yathothkari Perumal Temple, Pandava Thoothar Perumal Temple and alludes to one additional temple the Varadharaja Perumal Temple, Kanchipuram as a Main temple for these 3 Perumals. The similes used in the poem are those found in the Vedic and Puranic mythologies of Hinduism.

In the context of government structure and economic activity, the poem mentions the Kanchi king surrounding himself with counselors, as having a fair system to adjudicate disputes and deliver justice, someone who was ruthless against his enemies and robbers. He rode lotus-topped chariot. His coastal regions had lighthouses and other infrastructure to guide the ships, swan-shaped lamps were imported from the yavanas (Greek-Romans, or foreigners to Tamil region), farmers using bullocks as aid to agriculture, blacksmith using bellows made from animal skin (kollan), the production of salt and its export, pepper trade, and merchant highways guarded by soldiers.

A variety of religious festivals and sports are mentioned in the poem, in which both men and women participated. The poem has at least 73 similes.

== See also ==
- Eighteen Greater Texts
- Sangam literature
