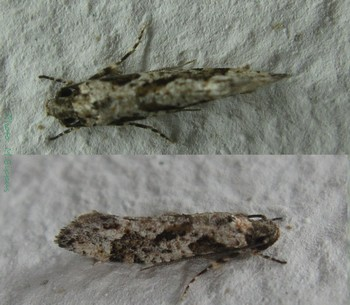

Scientific classification
- Kingdom: Animalia
- Phylum: Arthropoda
- Clade: Pancrustacea
- Class: Insecta
- Order: Lepidoptera
- Family: Tineidae
- Subfamily: Hapsiferinae
- Genus: Tiquadra; Walker, 1863

Type species
- Tiquadra inscitella Walker, 1863

Synonyms
- Oscella Walker, 1863; Manchana Walker, 1866; Ventia Walker, 1866; Acureuta Zeller, 1877; Mastigostoma Meyrick, 1911; Cyathaula Meyrick, 1886

= Tiquadra =

Genus of insects

Tiquadra is a genus of moths belonging to the family Tineidae.

Some species are:

- Tiquadra aeneonivella Walker, 1864 (from Venezuela)
- Tiquadra albescens (Diakonoff, 1968) (from Philippines)
- Tiquadra atomarcha Meyrick, 1917 (from Australia)
- Tiquadra butyranthes Meyrick, 1931 (from Brazil)
- Tiquadra circumdata (Zeller, 1877) (from Colombia, French Guyana)
- Tiquadra cultrifera Meyrick, 1914 (from Ghana to Congo)
- Tiquadra crocidura Meyrick, 1922 (from Brazil)
- Tiquadra drapetica Meyrick, 1919 (from Brazil)
- Tiquadra enstacta Meyrick, 1928 (from Andaman)
- Tiquadra etiennei Viette, 1988 (from La Réunion)
- Tiquadra exercitata Meyrick, 1922 (from Brazil)
- Tiquadra galactura Meyrick, 1931 (from Brazil)
- Tiquadra ghesquierei Gozmány, 1967 (from Congo)
- Tiquadra goochii Walsingham, 1881 (South Africa, Congo, Comoros)
- Tiquadra guillermeti Viette, 1988 (from La Réunion)
- Tiquadra gypsatma (Meyrick, 1911) (from Seychelles)
- Tiquadra halithea (Meyrick, 1927) (from Vanuatu)
- Tiquadra inophora (Meyrick, 1919) (from New Guinea)
- Tiquadra inscitella Walker, 1863 (from Mexico/Southern USA)
- Tiquadra maculata (Meyrick, 1886) (from Tonga)
- Tiquadra mallodeta Meyrick, 1924 (from Mexico)
- Tiquadra nivosa (Felder, 1875)(from Brazil)
- Tiquadra nubilella Amsel, 1956 (from Venezuela and Colombia)
- Tiquadra nucifraga Meyrick, 1919 (from Colombia)
- Tiquadra lentiginosa (Zeller, 1877) (from West Indies)
- Tiquadra lichenea Walsingham, 1897 (from Central African Rep. to South Africa)
- Tiquadra nivosa (Felder, 1875) (from Brazil)
- Tiquadra ochreata Gozmány, 1967 (from Congo)
- Tiquadra pircuniae (Zeller, 1877) (from Argentina)
- Tiquadra pontifica Meyrick, 1919 (from French Guiana)
- Tiquadra semiglobata Meyrick, 1922 from Peru
- Tiquadra seraphinei Guillermet, 2009
- Tiquadra vilis Meyrick, 1922 (from Argentina/Brazil)
