= S. Krishnaswami Aiyangar =

Indian historian, academician and Dravidologist (1871–1946)

S. Krishnaswamy Aiyangar
- Born: Sakkottai Krishnaswamy Aiyangar; 15 April 1871; Sakkottai, Madras Presidency
- Died: 26 November 1946 (aged 75); Madras, India
- Education: University of Madras
- Occupations: Historian, Academician, professor, author

Diwan Bahadur Sakkottai Krishnaswamy Aiyangar FRAS (15 April 1871 – 26 November 1946) was an Indian historian, academician and Dravidologist. He chaired the Department of Indian History and Archaeology at the University of Madras from 1914 to 1929.

Krishnaswamy Aiyangar was born in a village near Kumbakonam in 1871. He did his education in Madras and worked as a lecturer in Bangalore from 1899 to 1909. In 1914, he was made head of the department of Indian history and archaeology at the University of Madras, and held this post from 1914 to 1929. Krishnaswamy Aiyangar died in 1946 at the age of 76.

Aiyangar was elected a member of the Royal Asiatic Society in 1908 and was conferred a Diwan Bahadur title in 1928. He is known for the new methods he introduced in interpreting the history of Vijayanagar. His historical methodology is considered to be Indian nationalistic.

== Early life and education ==
Krishnaswamy Aiyangar was born in a Tamil brahmin family at village of Sakkottai near Kumbakonam on 15 April 1871. At the age of eleven, he lost his father. He had his schooling in Kumbakonam and graduated in history from the University of Madras in 1897. In 1899, he obtained his M. A. from the University of Madras and taught as a lecturer at the Central College of Bangalore from 1899 to 1909.

== Early career ==
In 1904, he was elected fellow of the Royal Asiatic Society. He was awarded an honorary PhD by the University of Calcutta. In 1928, the title of Diwan Bahadur was bestowed upon him.

== Head of Department of Indian History and Archaeology ==
In 1914, the University of Madras appointed Krishnaswamy Aiyangar to the chair of the department of Indian history and archaeology. Aiyangar headed the department till 1929. At about the same time, Aiyangar took over a struggling periodical called Journal of Indian History which was started by Shafaat Ahmed Khan in 1921. Aiyangar faced financial difficulties in the beginning but rescued the journal by persuading the University of Kerala to take over the magazine. By the time the university had taken over the magazine Aiyangar had already established the journal as one of the premium history magazines in the world.

Krishnaswamy Aiyangar was succeeded by K. A. Nilakanta Sastri to the chair of the Department of Indian History and Archaeology in 1929.

== Methodology ==
Krishnaswamy Aiyangar assisted Robert Sewell in his analyses of the epigraphy and archaeology of South India. These publications inspired Aiyangar to make a detailed enquiry into the history of Vijayanagar and by the 1920s, he had published a set of masterpieces on the history of Vijayanagar. His historical methodology was, however, a marked deviation from that of Sewell's and historians who had lived before him. His books devoted more attention to the Hindu-Muslim conflicts that shaped the history of Vijayanagar. In his 1921-book Ancient India, Aiyangar states that the Hoysala king Veera Ballala III "made a patriotic effort to dislodge the Muhammadans from the South... fell in the effort, and brought his dynasty to an end in carrying on this great national war of the Hindus". His views were echoed by Kannadiga historian B. A. Saletore and Telugu historian N. Venkatramanayya.

== Works ==
- Aiyangar, Sakkottai Krishnaswamy (1911). Ancient India. Luzac & Co.
- Aiyangar, Sakkottai Krishnaswamy; T. Rajagopalachariar; Malur Rangacharya (1911). Sri Ramanujacharya:A Sketch of his life and times. G. A. Natesan.
- Aiyangar, Sakkottai Krishnaswamy (1914). A History of India. Longmans Green.
- Aiyangar, Sakkottai Krishnaswamy (1919). Sources of Vijayanagar History. University of Madras.
- Aiyangar, Sakkottai Krishnaswamy (1920). Early history of Vaishnavism in South India. University of Madras.
- Aiyangar, Sakkottai Krishnaswamy (1921). South India and her Muhammadan invaders. Oxford University Press.
- Aiyangar, Sakkottai Krishnaswamy (1923). Some contributions of South India to Indian culture. University of Calcutta.
- Aiyar, R. Sathyanatha; Sakkottai Krishnaswamy Aiyangar (1924). History of the Nayaks of Madura. Oxford University Press.
- Aiyangar, Sakkottai Krishnaswamy (1926). Hindu India from Original Sources. K & J. Cooper.
- Rasanayagam, C.; Sakkottai Krishnaswamy Aiyangar (1926). Ancient Jaffna: being a research into the history of Jaffna from very early times to the Portuguese period.
- Dikshitar, V. R. Ramachandra; Sakkottai Krishnaswamy Aiyangar (1929). Hindu Administrative Institutions. University of Madras.
- Sewell, Robert; Sakkottai Krishnaswamy Aiyangar (1932). The Historical Inscriptions of Southern India (collected Till 1923) and Outlines of Political History. Diocesan Press.
- Aiyangar, Sakkottai Krishnaswamy (1940). A history of Tirupathi. C. Sambaiah Pantulu.
- Aiyangar, Sakkottai Krishnaswamy (1940). Seran Vanji: Vanji, the Capital of the Cheras. Cochin Govt. Press.
- Aiyangar, Sakkottai Krishnaswmy (1941). Ancient India and South Indian History & Culture: Papers on Indian History and Culture; India to A.D. 1300. Oriental Book Agency.
- Aiyangar, Sakkottai Krishnaswamy. Evolution of Hindu Administrative Institutions in South India.
