= Cholas of Nellore =

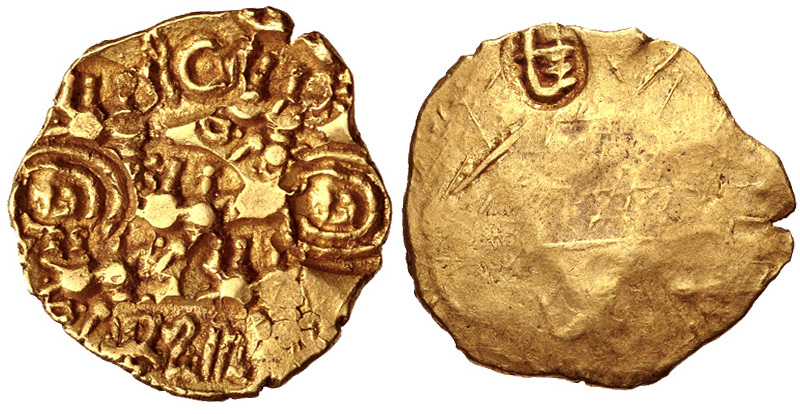
Coinage of the Nellore Chodas. King Bhoja II, 1216-1316 CE. Uniface flan with central lion standing left, four additional lion, two śri, uncertain, and bhujabha legend in Telugu punchmarks

Cholas of Nellore, also known as Nellore Chodas or Nellore Cholas, were the most prominent dynasty of Telugu Chola families who ruled over parts of Andhra Pradesh in the 11th and 14th centuries. They were chieftains to Imperial Cholas, Kakatiyas and Western Chalukyas and ruled over the Nellore region. The dominance of Nellore Cholas grew towards the end of the Velanandu Chola dynasty, when they started to ruled independently with authority in periods, They claimed descent from the early Chola Tamil king Karikala Chola.

Mostly their records are found in Telugu and also in Tamil (particularly associated with Tamil region), Sanskrit and Grantha. They were great patrons of Telugu literature.

== Rulers ==
Twelve rulers of the line ruled for more than two centuries, and at times, their power expanded over the majority of Andhra region and beyond into the Hoysala and Imperial Chola kingdoms.

- Bijjana Choda
- Manumasiddharasa I
- Dayabhima and Nallasiddharasa
- Errasiddha
- Manumasiddharasa II
- Tammusiddhi
- Tikka Choda I or Thirukalatti
- Allutikka, Manumasiddharasa III and Vijayagandagopala
- Tikka Choda II
- Manumagandagopala or Nallasiddharasa III
- Rajagandagopala or Ranganatha
- Viragandagopala

== History ==
These Chodas claimed their descent from the famous early Chola ruler, Karikala. They ruled over their kingdom consisting of the Nellore, Cuddapah, Chittoor and Chengalput districts with Vikramasimhapuri (modern Nellore) as their capital.

Choda Bijjana was the first important chief in the Nellore Choda clan. As a feudatory of Someswara I of Western Chalukyas, he took part in the wars of the Chalukyas and Later Cholas. In recognition of the loyalty and services of his descendants to the Chalukyas of Kalyani, Vikramadiya II appointed them as rulers of Pakanadu.

Later Choda Tikka (1223–1248), the father of the famous Manumasiddhi, extended his kingdom to as far south as the river Kaveri. He owed nominal allegiance to the already crippled Later Cholas. Along with the Hoysala Vira Narasimha, he helped the Later Cholas ruler Rajaraja Chola III in restoring him back to his throne by repulsing the attacks of Aniyanka Bhima, Kopperunchinga II and the Pandyas.

Subsequently, when the Hoyasala Vira Narasimha's successor Somesvara, desirous of making the Later Chola ruler a puppet in his hands, joined hands with the Pandyas and attacked Rajendra III, Choda Tikka came to the rescue of the Chola emperor. He defeated both the Hoyasala and the Pandyan forces and got thereby the Tondaimandalam region for himself. He even assumed the title Cholasthapanacharya. During the reign of Tikka's son and successor Vijaya Gandagopala (1248–1263), the power of the Nellore Cholas was at its low ebb. Vijayagandagopala and his brothers Manumasiddha III and Allutikka were ruling Nellore kingdom together.

In 1260 AD, Jatavarman Sundara Pandyan I overran Vijaya Gandagopala's territory and marched as far as Nellore where he performed 'Virabhisheka'. He anointed himself as king of Kanchi. About the same year, a dangerous feud broke out between Manumasiddhi III and Katamaraju, the chief of Erragaddapadu in Kanigiri region. The feud was on the issue of the rights of the two princes to use certain wide meadows as grazing grounds for their flocks of cattle. It led to the fierce engagement of the two sides and the bloody battle was fought at Panchalingala on the Paleru river. Manumasiddhi's forces led by Khadga Tikkana, the cousin of poet Tikkana won the battle, but the leader perished. This feud and the consequent battle formed the theme of the popular ballad entitled "Katamaraju Katha". Shortly after this disastrous battle, Manumasiddhi died.

With the death of Manumasiddhi III, the Nellore kingdom lost its individuality, became a battle ground between the Kakatiyas and the Pandyas and changed hands frequently. In the reign of Kakatiya Prataparudra II, the Nellore region became part and parcel of the Kakatiya empire and lost its political significance.

== Religion ==
The region during this period witnessed both Saivism and Vaishnavism.

== Literature ==
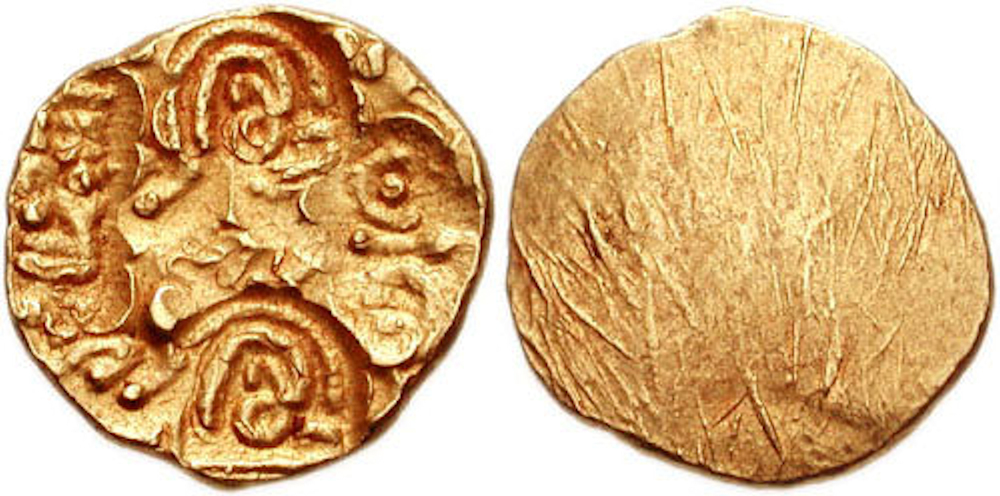
Coinage of King Manuma II of the Telugu Chodas. Circa 1250-1291 CE.

The period of rule of the Telugu Chodas was in particular significant for the development it received in the Telugu literature under the patronage of the rulers. It was the age in which the Telugu poets Tikkana, Ketana and Marana enriched the literature with their remarkable contributions. Tikkana Somayaji was a minister of Manumasiddhi II of Nellore. This poet had for his credit two important works in Telugu. The first one is Nirvachanottara Ramayanamu. Though a highly Sanskritised style was employed, it is characterised by excellent literary qualities and abounding elements of Pathos and heroism. However it is the Andhra Mahabharata which brought for Tikkana undying fame and made him one of the immortals. Though it is a translation of the last fifteen volumes of the Mahabharata, left out by his predecessor Nannaya, yet Tikkana put life and blood into it with an avowed objective of making it an epic. His delineation of character, dramatic dialogue and lucid and at the same time suggestive exposition of facts are masterly in nature. His broad spiritual outlook, lofty idealism, high imagination and splendid diction made him Kavi Brahma (The Supreme Creator among poets).

They have released several stone inscriptions and copper plate inscriptions in Tamil, Telugu, Sanskrit and Grantha languages.

== See also ==
- Epic of Katamaraju
