= Mangammal chatram, Madurai =

Building in Tamil Nadu, India

Mangammal chatram is a chatram located at Madurai in Tamilnadu, India.

== Location ==
This chatram is found at Mela Veli Veethi-Railway junction. Rani Mangammal of Madurai was very fond of constructing many chatrams in important land routes in her name in many places, this is famous and big one.

== Structure ==
This chatram was built by Rani Mangammal in her name. For the convenience of devotees who were coming to Madurai Meenakshi Amman Temple and Rameswaram, this was built. The construction was started in 1894 A.D. and the work was completed in 1900 A.D. It has five building compartments having 24, 20, 15, 20, 18 rooms accordingly, totalling to 97 rooms. This was under the control of the District Administration. In those days there were separate rooms for Brahmins and others. There is a reference that this system was abolished by Justice Party.

== Present status ==
Presently under the control of Corporation, part of this chatram is used as guest house. Other parts are used as information and tourism centre.
