= Mangammal chatram, Narikkudi =

Mangammal chatram is a chatram located at Narikkudi in Virudhunagar district, Tamilnadu, India.

== Location ==
It is located at Mariyur near Narikkudi.

== Structure ==
It was built during the period of Mangammal as a resting place for her and others. It has many pillars with ornamental works.So many iconographical works are also found in it. Sculptures are found in the pillars. It has mandapa, more than 52 pillars, entrances on either side and other special aspects.

== Present status ==
Five decades a school was functioned there. In due course, due poor to maintenance it is in dilapidated condition. Attempts are made to request to protect this chatram and the chatram of Kariyapatti.
