= Davandai =

Percussion instrument from Tamil Nadu

Davandai is an ancient percussion instrument played during the rituals in some South Indian temples, most famously the Meenakshi Temple at Madurai. It is usually accompanied with Nagaswaram and it is used instead of Tavil

Davandai is a two-faced drum shaped like an hourglass. The two ends are covered with goatskin stretched by use of cords. Though it is a two-faced drum, only one side is struck with a stick held in the right hand. The drum itself is slung over the left shoulder of the performer. The drum is usually made out of the wood from the jackfruit tree, but there are drums also made in bronze.

Davandai is also known by other names – Echarikai in Kumbakonam and Veeravandi in Srirangam.

There are special temple rituals during which the Davandai is usually played. It is usually played as an accompaniment to the Nadaswaram in place of the traditional Thavil. In some temples, Davandai announces the “Swami Porappadu”, the onset of a procession of the temple idol.

Davandai is an ancient instrument that finds mentions in the Puranas. It is also depicted in the sculptures at the Madurai Meenakshi Temple.
