= Meenakshi Temple =

Historic Hindu temple in Madurai, Tamil Nadu, India

Meenakshi Temple Meenakshi Sundareswarar Temple
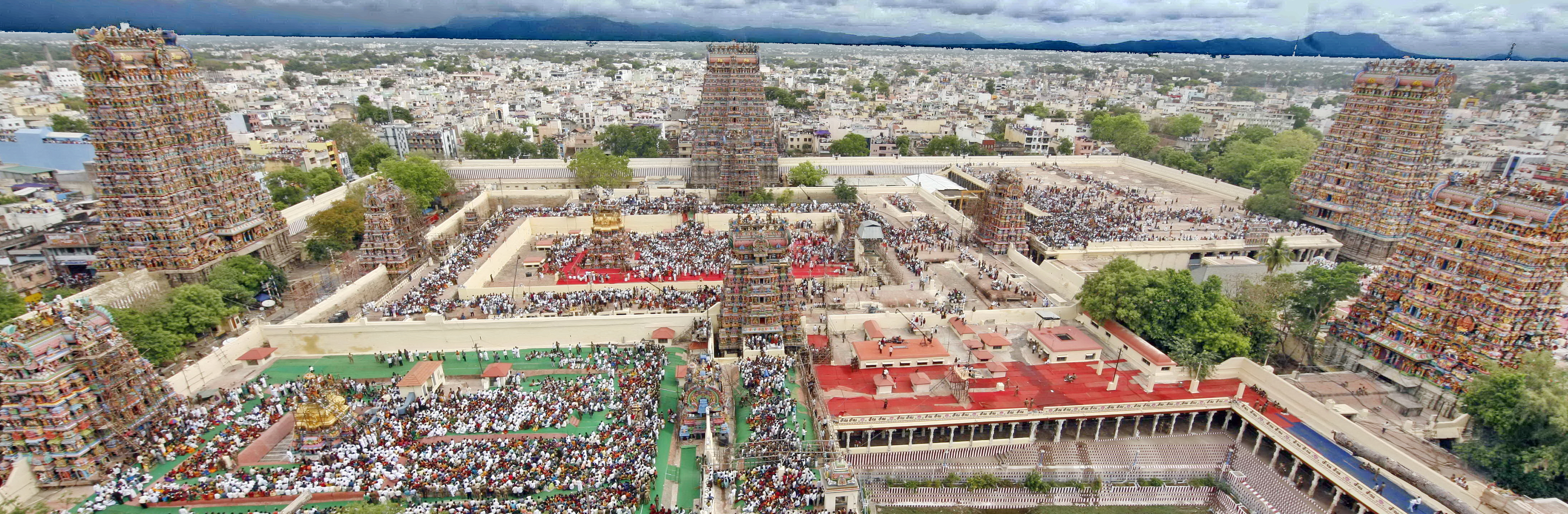
- Aerial view of the temple complex as seen from the southern gopuram

- Location within Tamil Nadu Location within India

Religion
- Affiliation: Hinduism
- District: Madurai
- Deity: Meenakshi (Angayarkanni); Sundareswarar (Chokkar)
- Festivals: Avani Moolam; Meenakshi Tirukalyanam; Maha Shivaratri; Navaratri; Thiruvathira
- Governing body: Hindu Religious and Charitable Endowments Department
- Features: Temple tank: Potramarai Kulam (Golden lotus Pond)

Location
- State: Tamil Nadu
- Country: India
- Interactive map of Meenakshi Temple; Meenakshi Sundareswarar Temple
- Coordinates: 9°55′11″N 78°07′10″E

Architecture
- Type: Tamil architecture
- Inscriptions: 40+
- Elevation: 144 m (472 ft)

Website
- maduraimeenakshi.hrce.tn.gov.in

Meenakshi Temple, also known as Meenakshi Sundareswarar Temple, is a historic Hindu temple located on the southern bank of the Vaigai River in Madurai, Tamil Nadu, India. It is dedicated to Meenakshi, (Note: Tamil transliteration:Mīṉākṣi or Mīṉāṭci) a form of Parvati, and her consort Sundareswarar (Note: Tamil transliteration: Suntarēsvarar) (Shiva). The temple is theologically significant as it represents a confluence of various denominations of Hinduism such as Shaivism, Shaktism, and Vaishnavism.

While the Sangam literature mentions the temple city of Madurai, the existence of a temple is first referenced in the Tamil texts from 6th century. It is one of the Paadal Petra Sthalams, Shiva temples that are revered in the Tevaram verses composed by the Nayanars between the 6th and 11th century. The early structures of the temple were built during the reign of the Pandyas in the 12th to 13th centuries. It was later rebuilt by the Vijayanagara Empire in the 14th century, after its destruction by the armies of the Delhi Sultanate. The temple complex was later expanded extensively by the Madurai Nayaks in the 16th and 17th centuries. While a few structural improvements were made during the 18th and 19th centuries, the temple condition degraded due to negligence during the British Raj. After the Indian independence in the mid 20th century, the temple was restored with donations collected from people. Further restoration and kumbhabhishekam of the temple was conducted in 1974, 1995, 2009, and 2026.

The temple complex is spread over 5.7 hectares (14 acres). It consists of monuments inside several concentric enclosures (prakara), each layer fortified with high masonry walls. The outer walls have four large gopurams (ornamental gateways), one on each cardinal direction, and 10 smaller gopurams. The tallest is the southern tower, which was built in the 16th century and rises to 170 ft (52 m). The shrines of Meenakshi and Sundareswarar, the prominent and largest of the shrines in the temple, is located in the courtyard of the innermost prakara. The complex has numerous mandapas, including the thousand pillared hall, which are used for housing idols, temple festivities, and as choultry. There are images of various Hindu gods located across various shrines and mandapas in the temple. The golden lotus pond (potramarai kulam) is the main temple tank, located within the premises.

The temple is managed by the Hindu Religious and Charitable Endowments Department of the Government of Tamil Nadu. The temple complex is a prominent landmark in Madurai and attracts thousands of visitors every day. Hence, it serves as an economic center, with the goods and services associate with the temple and its activities forming a significant part of the economy of Madurai. The state emblem of Tamil Nadu is based on the west gopuram (ornate tower) of the temple. In October 2017, the temple was adjudged the best 'Swachh Iconic Place' in India under the Swachh Bharat Abhiyan by the Government of India.

== Etymology ==
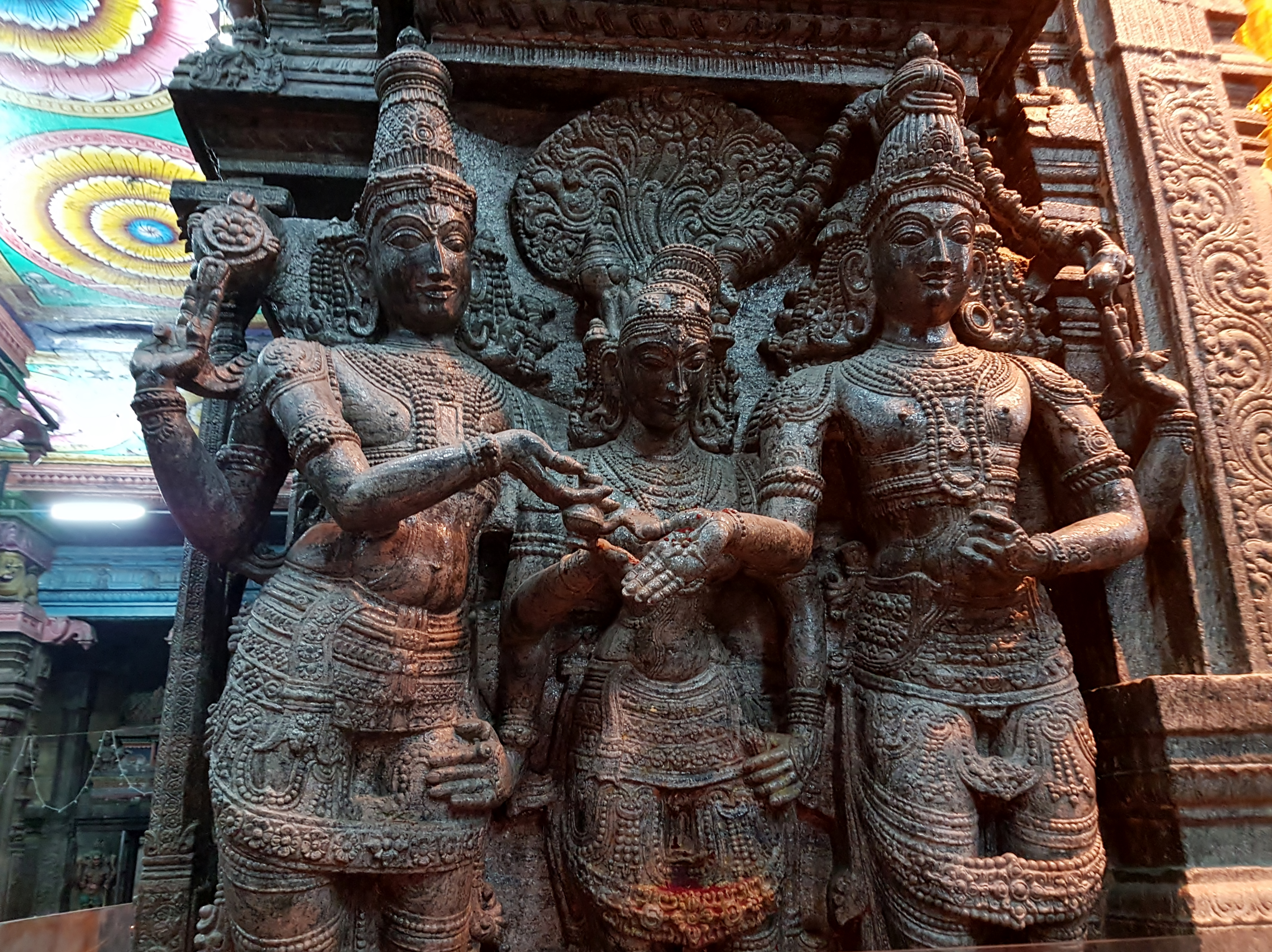
Sculpture depicting the Meenakshi Tirukalyanam; Vishnu (left) gives Meenakshi (centre) in marriage to Shiva

Meenakshi, a representation of goddess Parvati, is the principal deity of the temple. Meenakshi means "fish-eyed" in Tamil language, derived from the words mina ("fish") and akshi ("eyes"). She was earlier known by the name Thadadakai ("fish-eyed one"), and later became Meenakshi. The name of the goddess might also mean "rule of the fish", derived from the Tamil words meen (fish) and aatchi (rule), denoting the fish signage on the flag used by the Pandyas.

The Tevaram texts from the 7th to 8th centuries, mention the name of Meenakshi's consort Shiva as Angayarkanni udanurai Alavai Annal ("One who is with Angayarkanni"). Angayarkanni literally means "the mother with the beautiful fish eyes" in Tamil. According to the inscriptions found inside the temple, and dated to 13th century, the principal deities Shiva and Parvati, were known as Thiru Aalavaai Udaya Nayanar and Thiru Kaamakottam Udaiya Aalavaai Naachiyaar respectively. The name "Meenakshi" became more prevalent since the 17th century. The deity is spelt as Minaksi and the city as Madura in the 17th to early 20th-century texts.

== Mythology ==
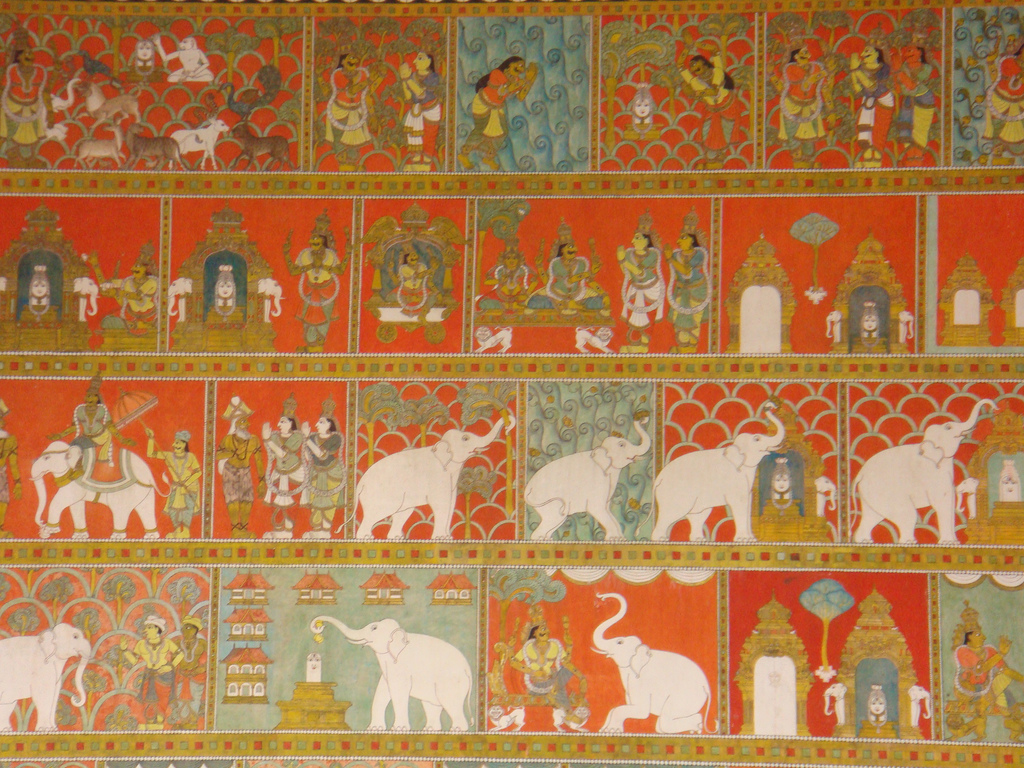
Temple wall painting depicting its founding legend

According to the 16th century Tamil text of Thiruvilaiyadal Puranam, king Malayadhwaja Pandya and his wife Kanchanamalai performed a yajna seeking a son to succeed the king. A daughter appeared out of the fire, who was three years old and had three breasts. When the parents prayed to Shiva, a divine voice advised them to bring up the child, and that she will lose the third breast when she meets her future husband. The girl grew up in the palace, and the king crowned her as his successor. When she finally met Shiva, who took the form of Sundareswarar, she took her true form of Meenakshi, an incarnation of Parvati. Meenakshi Tirukalyanam, the marriage of Meenakshi and Shiva was a grand event, with the attendance of various Hindu gods, and other celestial and living beings.

According to religious scholar William P. Harman, the story may reflect the matrilineal traditions prevalent in South India during the time and the regional beliefs that "[spiritual] powers rest with the women", gods listen to their spouse, and that the fates of kingdoms rest with the women. He notes:

For the vast majority of devotees of the divine couple of Madurai, Mīṉākṣi is more important than Śiva. [...] They visit her shrine first before worshipping Śiva. [...] In a strict sense, the goddess is closer to the people: according to tradition she was born in Madurai. Śiva came as an outsider, from a distant place, to take up his residence and to rule with her [...] she is regarded, indeed addressed, as Mother (ammaṉ), while Śiva is approached more formally as Lord (nāyakaṉ).

— William P. Harman, The Sacred Marriage of a Hindu Goddess (1992)

According to historian Susan Bayly, the reverence for Meenakshi is a part of the Hindu goddess tradition that integrates with the Hindu society where the "woman is the lynchpin of the system" of social relationships. According to anthropologist Christopher Fuller, the wedding represents a symbolic paradigm for human marriages during the time.

== Significance ==
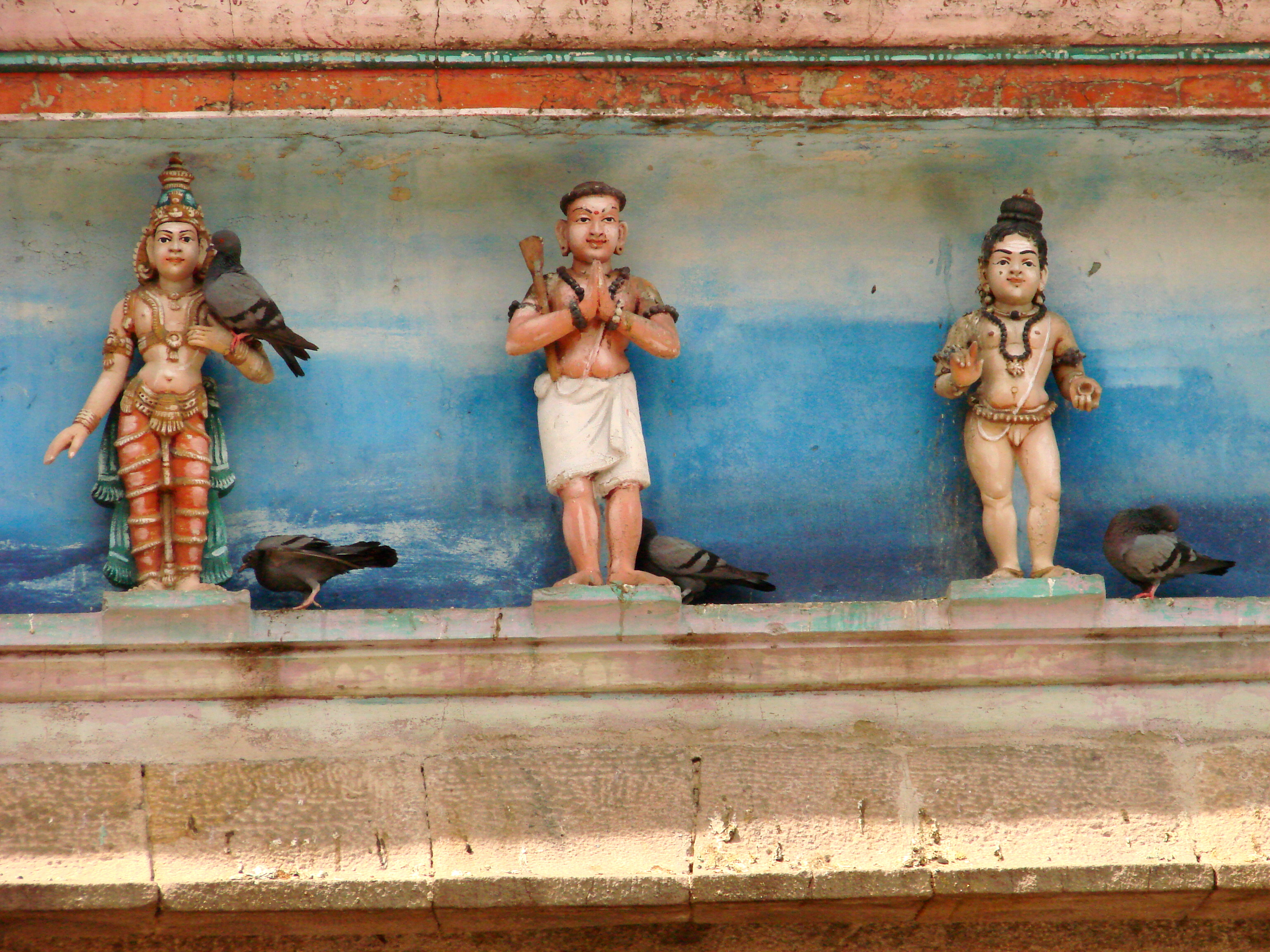
Sculptures of Nayanars–Sundarar, Appar, and Sambandar, as depicted in one of the temple towers

The temple implies an affinal, protective relationship between Shaivism and Vaishnavism traditions of Hinduism, by portraying Shiva as the husband of Meenakshi, and Vishnu as her brother, a significant relationship in Dravidian kinship system. Meenakshi herself is a central part of the Shaktism tradition of Hinduism, and represented as the dominant figure of the pair in this temple. The temple thus symbolically celebrates all three of its major traditions.

According to the Thiruvilaiyadal Puranam, the temple is amongst the four most important of the 68 pilgrimage places in Shaivism, along with Varanasi, Chidambaram, and Tirukkalatti. As per Hindu mythology, the shrine of Sundareswarar is considered as one of the Pancha Sabhai (five courts), where the Shiva performed cosmic dance. It corresponds to the "Velli Ambalam" (silver abode) derived from the Tamil words velli meaning silver and ambalam meaning stage or altar, and the Nataraja sculpture is situated on a large silver altar in the temple.

Over the years, the temple has been a centre of Tamil culture and literature. The temple is one of those revered in the Tevaram hymns, compiled as part of Tirumurai, composed by Nayanars, Shiva poets who lived between the 6th and 11th centuries. As the temple is revered in the Tevaram, it is classified as a Paadal Petra Sthalam, one of the 276 temples mentioned in the Tamil Shaiva canon. The temple is described as "Mathura in the South" in the Vaishnavite texts. Kumaraguruparar, a 17th-century Tamil poet, composed Meenakshi Pillaitamil in praise of the deity of this temple. Shyama Shastri, one of the Trinity of Carnatic music, composed a set of nine Telugu songs in praise of Meenakshi of Madurai, which are referred to as Navaratnamalika (Garland of nine gems).

== History ==
=== Early history (before 12th century) ===
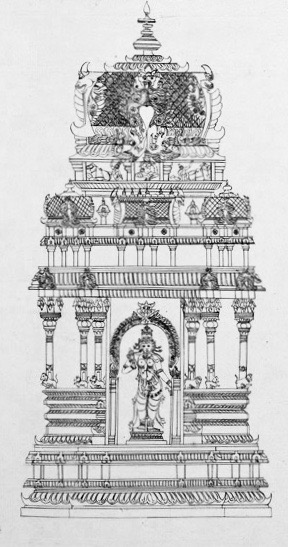
A sketch of the Meenakshi shrine

The town of Madurai is described from the Sangam era texts, dated to 1st to 4th century. Tamil texts imply that a temple existed in Madurai by the mid-6th century. As per these texts, the town of "Koodal" (Madurai) is described as a temple town where every street radiated from the temple. In the Teveram texts, the temple and its deity are referred to by various epithets and names. In Campantar describes the deity as Aalavaai Iraivan. In early medieval literature and inscriptions, it is sometimes referred to as Kadambavanam as the region was covered with Kadamba trees. Various descriptions and mythology associated with the temple are described in regional texts and literature, which are often centered around a warrior goddess, but the details vary significantly and are inconsistent with each other. Hence, scholars have attempted to determine the history of the temple from the inscriptions and records relating to South Indian dynasties. However, most of these are dated to post 12th century.

During the rule of the Pandya dynasty, goddess Meenakshi is described as the divine ruler of Madurai, who along with Shiva were revered as the primary deities. The earliest of the existing masonry of the Meenakshi temple was built during the reign of the Pandya emperor Sadayavarman Kulasekaran I (r. 1190–1216). The gopuram at the entrance of the Sundareswarar shrine and the central portion of the Meenakshi shrine were built during his reign. Texts and inscriptions also credit him with building shrines for Nataraja and Surya near the main sanctum, Ayyanar in the east, Vinayagar in the south, Kariamal Perumal in the west and Kali in the north of the temple complex. The temple was later expanded during the reign of Maravarman Sundara Pandyan I (r. 1216–1238). During his reign, Ananda Nambi built the Vembathurar gopuram, and another large gopuram (named after Sundara Pandya) was added in 1231. Maravarman Sundara Pandyan II (r. 1238–1251) added the Chitra gopuram in the west, a pillared corridor heading towards the Sundareswarar shrine, and a mandapa named after him.

=== Destruction, restoration and expansion (14th century to 17th century) ===
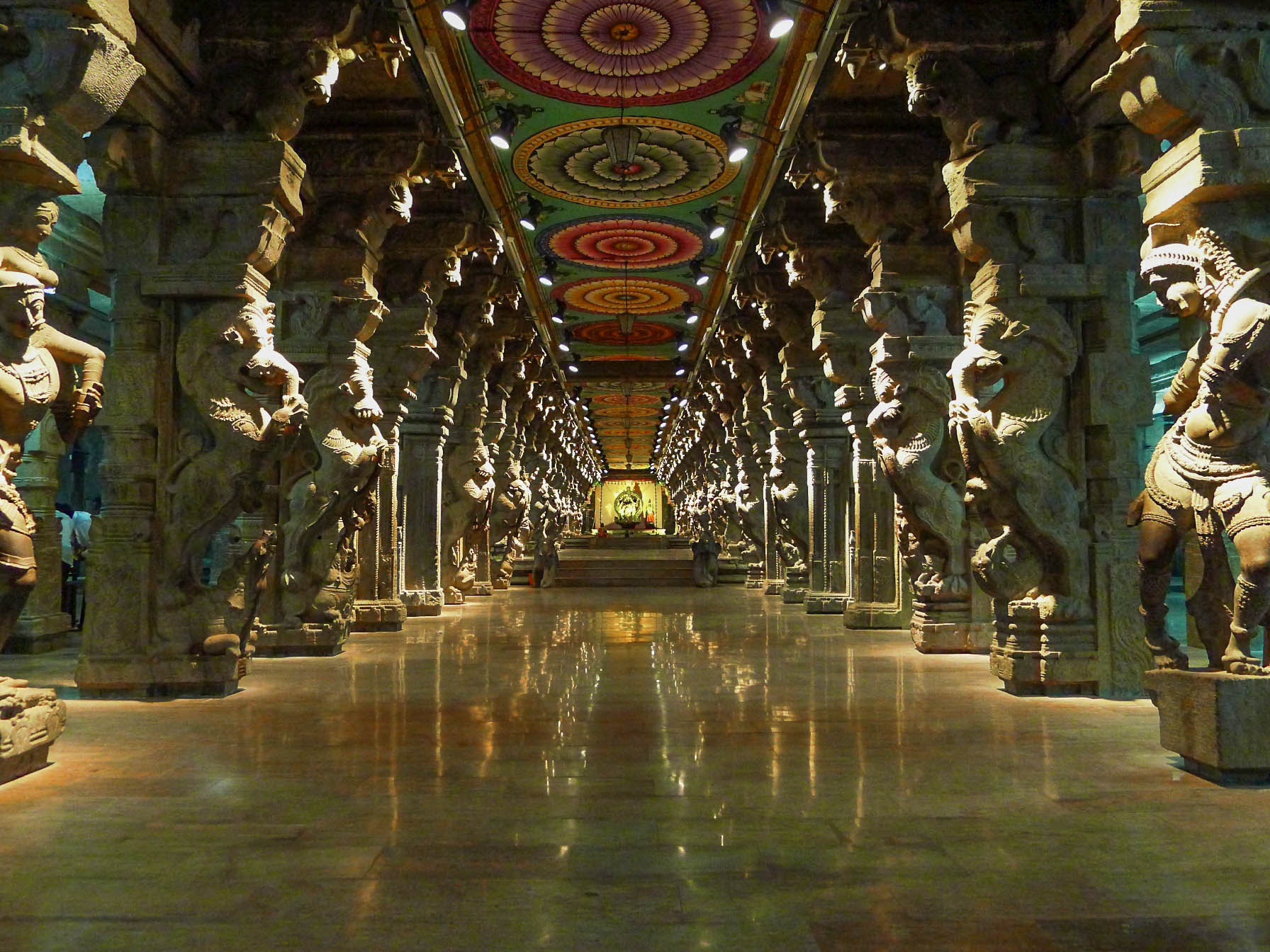
A pillared mandapa at the temple added during the Nayak period

After the death of Maravarman Kulasekhara I in 1310, his sons Vira Pandya IV and Sundara Pandya IV fought a war of succession for control of the Pandya empire. It coincided with the South Indian raids of the Khalji dynasty of the Delhi Sultanate. As per available records, Malik Kafur raided various towns and destroyed the Hindu temples including the Meenakshi temple, while looting them. He took back an enormous loot of gold and jewellery from the Pandya kingdom to Delhi in 1311. The Islamic invasion brought an abrupt end to the patronage of the Hindu temples. After the conquest and destruction, a Muslim governor was named to rule Madurai, and later established the Madurai Sultanate. The Sultanate sought tributes from the temples, and caused further damage.

The Vijayanagara Empire was established in early 14th century and succeeded in capturing Madurai in 1378. According to Madhura Vijayam, Kumara Kampana was asked by his wife Gangadevi to liberate Madurai, and reopen the Meenakshi temple. According to the text Thirupanimalai, Kampana after completing his conquest of Madurai, rebuilt the temple structure and built defensive walls around the temple. The temple idols, which were hidden during the Sultanate rule, were brought back and reconsecrated in the temple. Though the Meenakshi temple existed earlier, most of the present masonry were rebuilt and added since the 14th century. The restoration of the temple took a while, and it was repaired and expanded along with other regional temples. The two gopurams located to the east and west of the Sundareswarar shrine were built in 1372 and 1374 respectively.

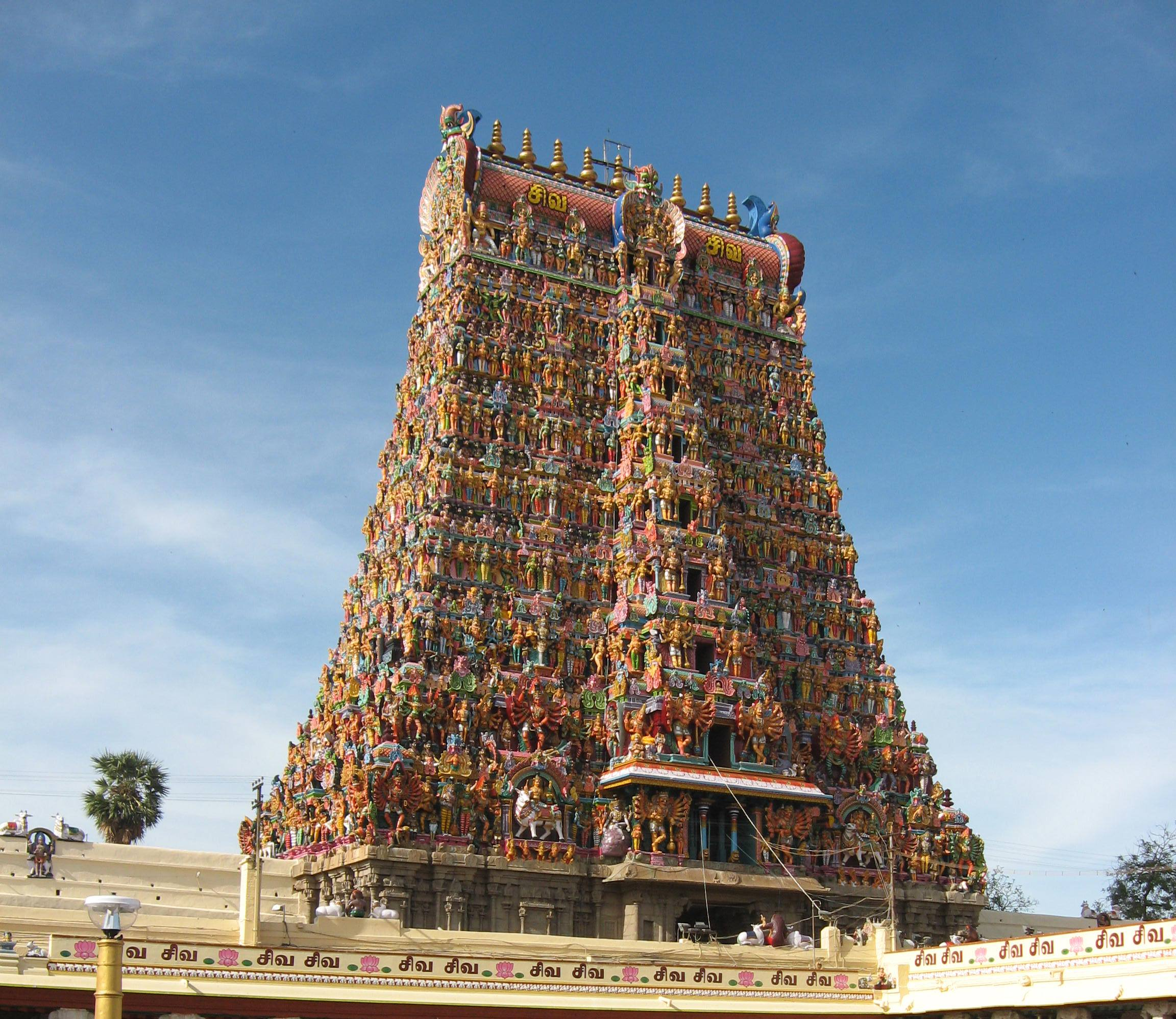
The south gopuram, the tallest tower, was added in the 16th century

The temple inscriptions suggest that the Vijayanagara rulers participated in the ceremonies of the temple and made grants to cover the expenses for daily operations of the temple. The Nayak commanders, who served under the Vijayanagara empire, expanded the temple further. In the mid 15th century, Lakana Nayak added the defensive walls around the first prakara, and renovated the Mahamandapa and the Meenakshi shrine. He also built the Paliarai (bed chamber), where the icons of the gods symbolically spend the night. The Nataraja shrine was added in the late 15th century by Arulalan Sevahadevan Vanathirayan, who also renovated the Thiruvalavaiudaiyar shrine. In 1516, Saluvanarasana Nayak constructed the sacred pool named Ezhukadal (seven seas). Chinnappa Nayak constructed the Nayaka mandapa in 1526. Chettiappa Nayak rebuilt the Dvarapala mandapa in front of the Sannadhi gopuram, the north colonnade of the golden lotus tank, and added a second protective wall around the Meenakshi shrine.

The temple was further renovated and expanded in the 16th and 17th centuries by the Madurai Nayaks. Much of the present complex reflects construction and expansion under the Nayaks, who also organised the surrounding streets according to the principles associated with Vastu shastra. During the reign of Vishwanatha Nayak (r. 1529–1564), the temple complex was further fortified and the vimana above the Meenakshi shrine was gilded with gold. Under the supervision his prime minister Ariyanatha Mudaliar, more towers and various sculpted pillared halls, including the thousand pillared hall, were added. The Nayaka gopuram in the second prakara was built in 1530, while the Palahai gopuram was added later. The Kadaka gopuram in Meenakshi's shrine was built around the mid 16th century. The granite structures of the various gopuras were renovated by Kumara Krishnappa Nayak (r. 1564–1572). The Murthiyamman and Nandi mandapas were also added during his reign. The south gopuram, the tallest tower, was built in the late 16th century. The Mottai gopuram ("bald" gateway) was started during the reign of Krishnappa Nayak (r. 1572–1595), but was not completed till 1878. The Murugan shrine in the north east corner of the second prakara, the Kambathadi and golu mandapas were added during his reign. The Vira vasantha, Iruttu, and Kilikoondu mandapas were completed in 1611, 1613, and 1623 respectively during the reign of Muthu Veerappa Nayak (r. 1609–1623). The Vasantha mandapa was added during the reign of Tirumala Nayaka (r. 1623–1655). The corridors of the temple tank and the Meenatchi Nayak mandapa were built during the reign of Rani Mangammal (r. 1689–1704). The Nagara mandpa was built by Achaya Rayar, the minister of Rani Mangammal in 1635.

=== Later history (18th century to present) ===
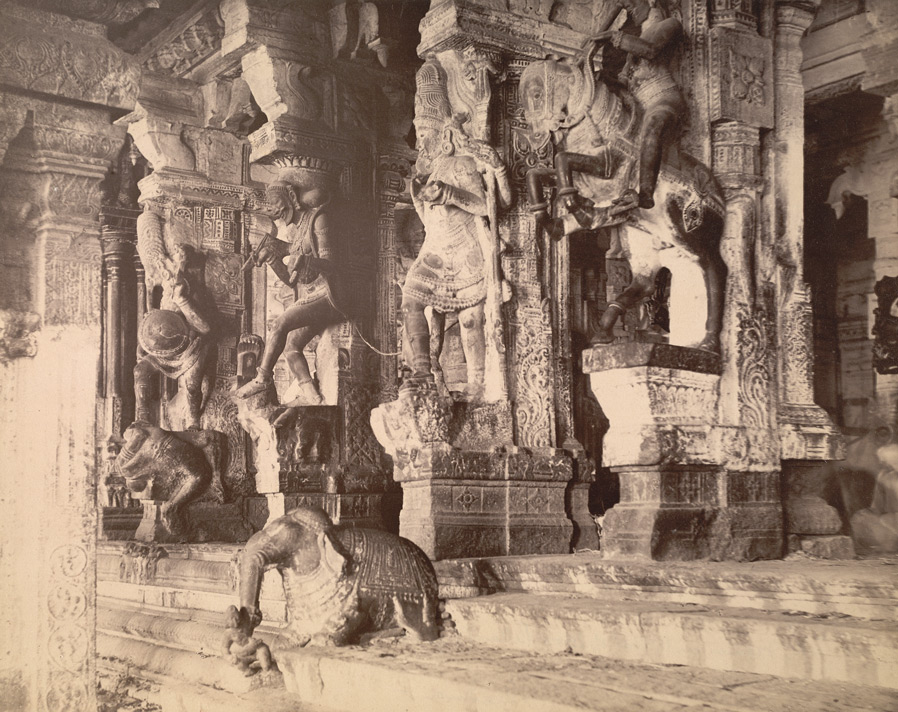
Sculptures in the temple (1895)

During the 18th century, the British gave endowments to the temple and participated in temple festivities to gain socio-political acceptance. Robert Clive donated the jewels looted by the British from Srirangapatna to the temple. However, in 1820, they withdrew from their roles as temple patrons and only participated in temple festivities. The Christian missionaries ridiculed the temple artwork and criticised the temple practices. However, the missionary efforts were largely unsuccessful with people continuing to patronise the temple.

A few structural improvements were made during the 18th and 19th centuries. The Servaikarar mandapa was built by the Marudu brothers in 1795. The Mottai gopuram was completed, and the Nadukkattu gopuram was added during the time. The Idabhakkuri gopuram was also renovated during the period.

The Dalits were prohibited entry into the temple till the early 20th century. On 8 July 1939, a group of Dalits led by A. Vaidyanatha Iyer and Kakkan, entered the temple. This event was one of the precursors to the legislation enacted by the Madras Presidency later that year that removed such discriminatory practices against the depressed classes.

During the British Raj, the temple condition degraded due to negligence. After the Indian independence, the temple was restored with donations collected from people. The temple is maintained and administered by the Hindu Religious and Charitable Endowments Department of the Government of Tamil Nadu. Restoration and kumbhabhishekam of the temple was conducted in 1974, 1995, 2009, and 2026.

== Design and architecture ==
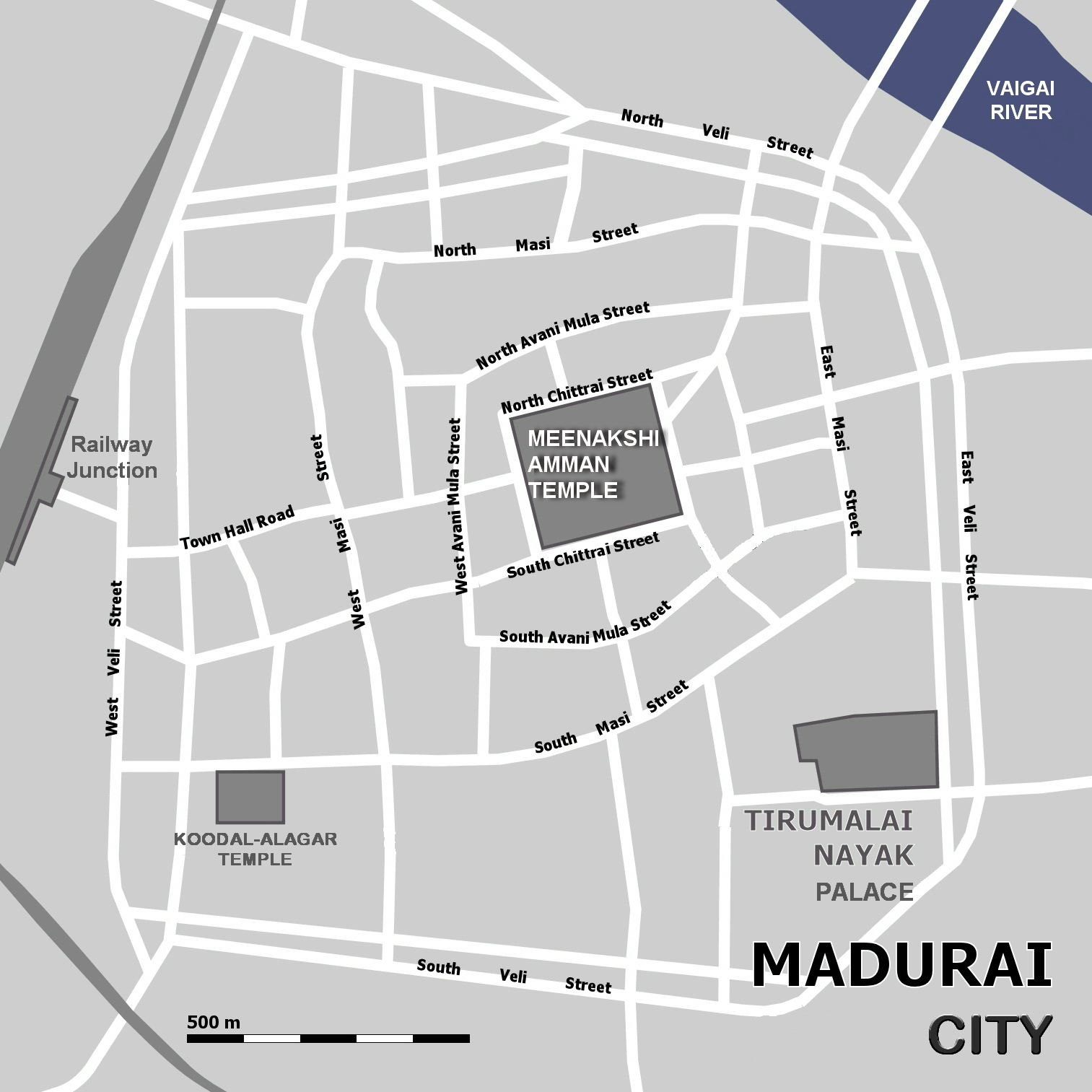
Map of the temple and adjoining streets

The Meenakshi temple is located in the heart of Madurai, on the southern bank of the Vaigai River. The Nayak rulers followed the Shilpa Shastras, Hindu texts on architecture, in designing the temple and the city. The roads radiating from the temple complex, form a concentric pattern around the temple. The streets and junctions are named after months of the Tamil Calendar, originating from the practice of starting the temple procession from the spots corresponding to the respective months. The temple and the city were designed to face east, to face the Sun in the morning. (Note: While the temple faces east, the shrines and gopurams are not exactly aligned east-west.) Tamil texts mention that the temple was the centre of the city and the streets radiated out like a lotus and its petals. In the Middle Ages, the city developed around the temple, with human settlements structured as per the varna system. The royalty, Kshatriyas and Vaishyas lived on the southeast side of the temple, the Brahmins lived in special quarters close to the temple, and others in other areas and fringes of the city. The king initiated processions from the temple to associate his royal authority with the divine and thus upheld the social system.

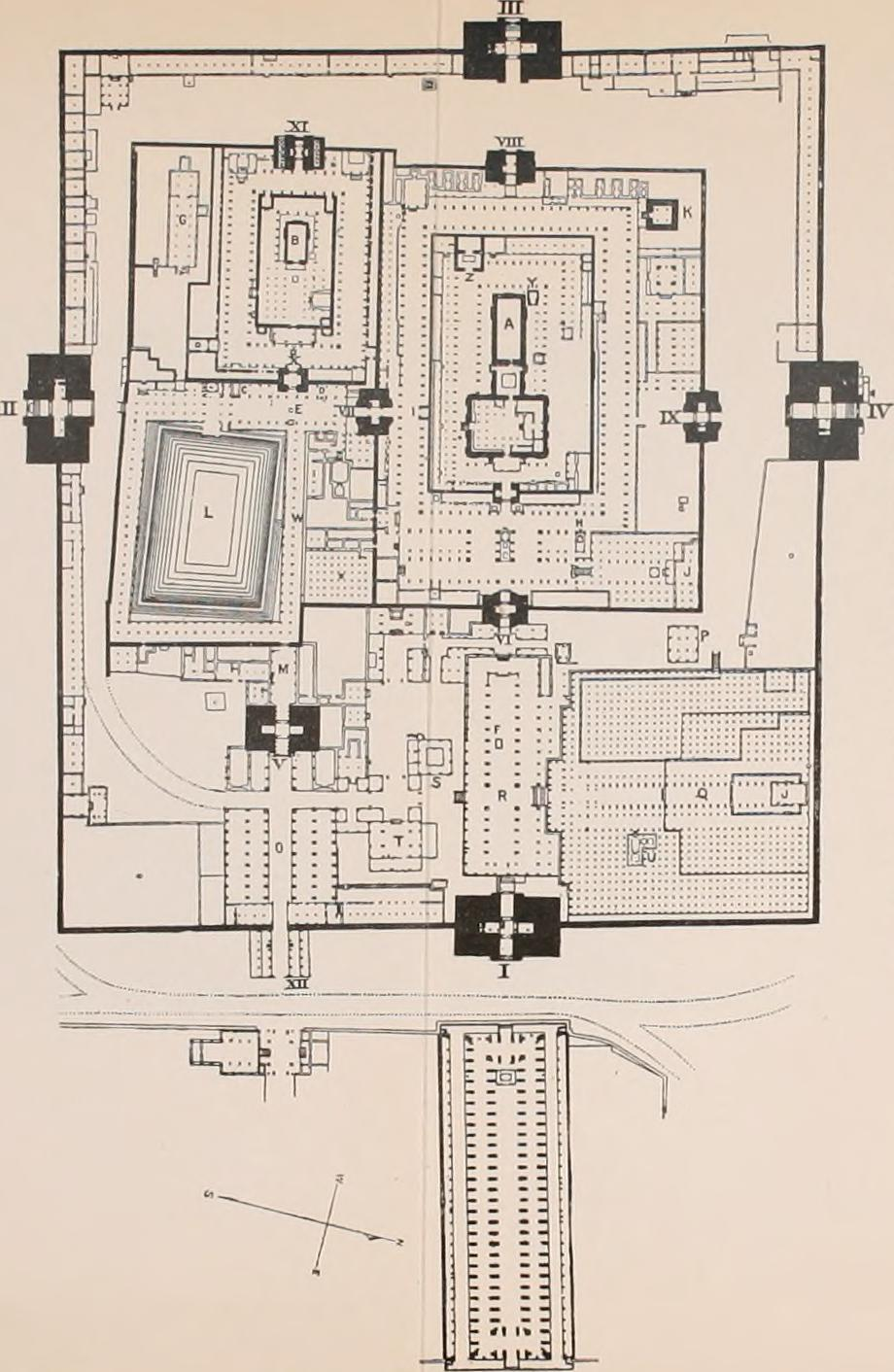
Plan of the temple (1911)

The main shrines are located in the center of the temple complex, surrounded by various monuments inside concentric prakarams (enclosures). The enclosures are fortified with high masonry walls, with the outer walls having four towering gopurams (gateways), one each on either direction, which allow people to enter the complex from all four directions. The temple corridors and streets are used for accommodating elaborate processions during the festivals, and the temple cars used in the processions are progressively more massive the further they travel from the centre. The temple is surrounded by shops and traditional markets along the surrounding streets.

The temple complex is spread over an area of 5.7 ha (14 acres). The main courtyard measures 240 m (800 ft) on each side, with one side side about 15 m (50 ft) longer. Of the numerous shrines, the important and largest are the shrines of Meenakshi (B) and Sundareswarar (A), located parallel to each other in the innermost courtyard. The Potramarai kulam (golden lotus pond) (L) is located in front of the Meenakshi shrine and the Ayiram kaal mandapam (thousand-pillared hall) (Q), with its numerous sculptures, is located on the north-eastern part of the complex. The complex also incorporates various other mandapas, shrines of Hindu deities, sculptures of scholars from the Sangam period, and other buildings such as religious schools, administrative offices, elephant sheds, equipment sheds, and gardens.

According to historian Holly Reynolds, a closer examination of the temple plan and the city, suggests that it is a mandala, a cosmic diagram laid out based on principles of symmetry and loci. The temple complex has been in continuous use since the early middle ages except for about 60 years when it was closed after its destruction in the 14th century. Before the early 19th century CE, the temple complex itself was surrounded by a layer of the old city's fortified walls, which was demolished by the British. The temple has its traditional version of history called Thiruvilayadal (sacred games of Shiva), and sixty four of these episodes are painted as murals around the temple walls. These depict the history of the temple including the destruction of Madurai and the temple, and its rise from the ruins.

=== Gopurams ===
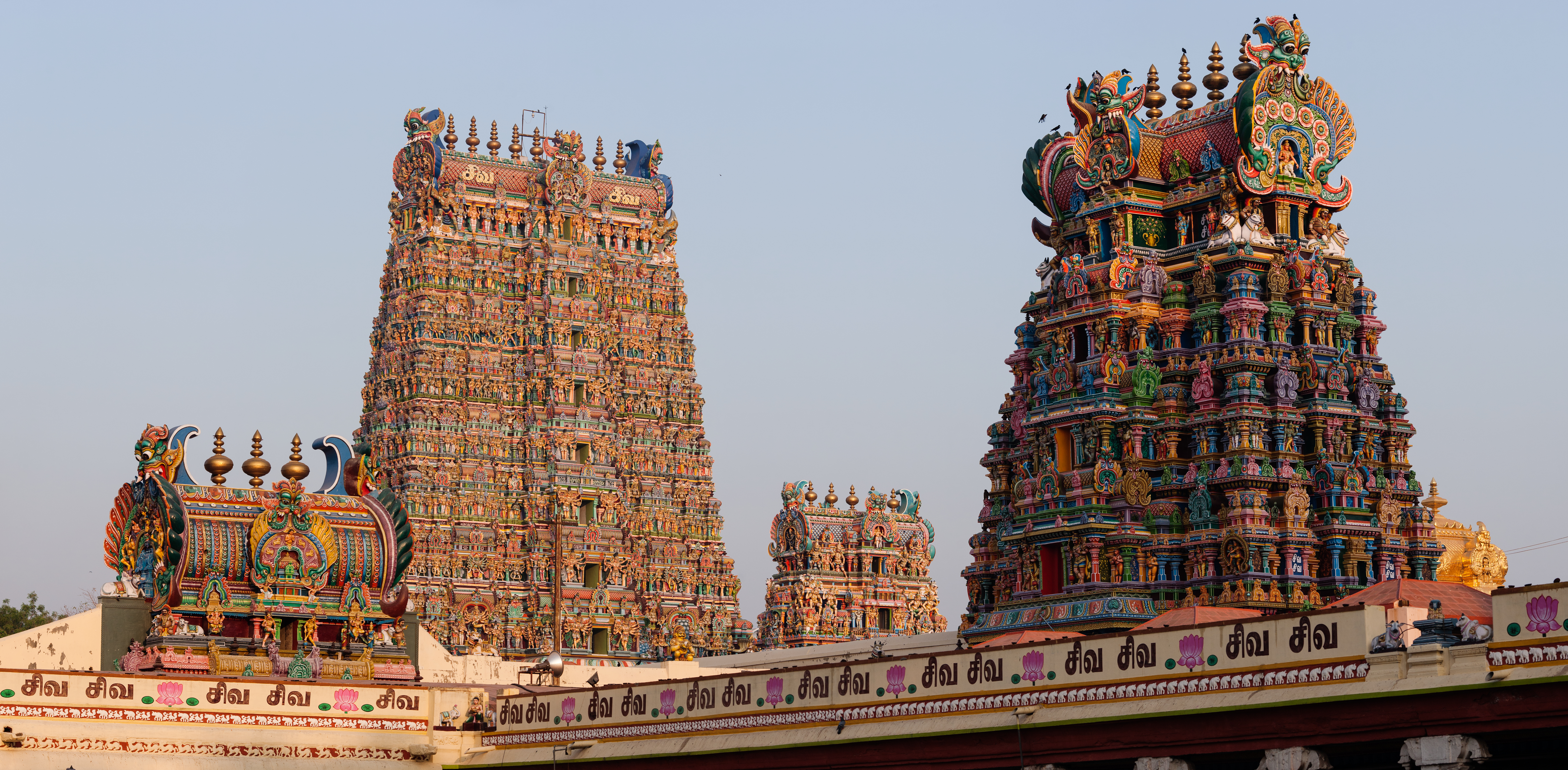
The temple has 14 gopurams (towers). The tallest tower in the image is the West gopuram.

The main shrines of the temple are surrounded by three walled enclosures with each of these walls having four gateways, one each in every cardinal direction. The temple has 14 gopurams (ornate towers), located along the various gateways, with the towers on the outer walls larger than the corresponding inner towers. It includes 4 nine-storey, 1 seven-storey, 5 five-storey, and 2 three-storey gopurams, and two gold-gilded sanctum towers. Of these, five are located on gateways leading to the Sundareswarar shrine and three to the Meenakshi shrine. The outer gopurams are located along the main entrances to the temple and the inner gopurams are located at the entrance gateways to various shrines. The towers are covered with stucco images of various Hindu deities, saints, and figures from Hindu mythology. Panels in each storey often depict an episode from regional or Hindu legend, with the four gopurams on the outer walls depicting nearly 4,000 such mythological stories.

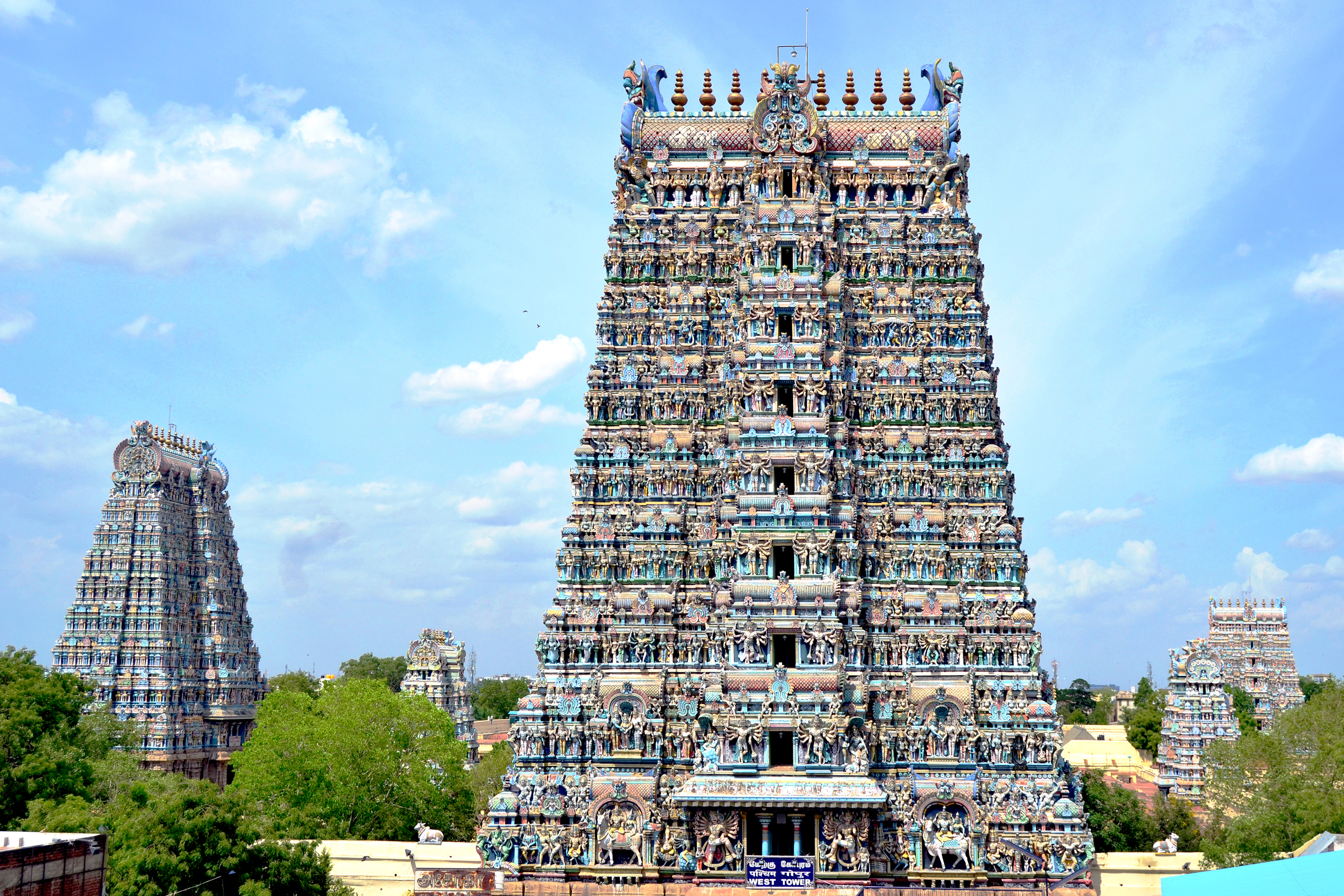
Various gopurams as seen from the West tower

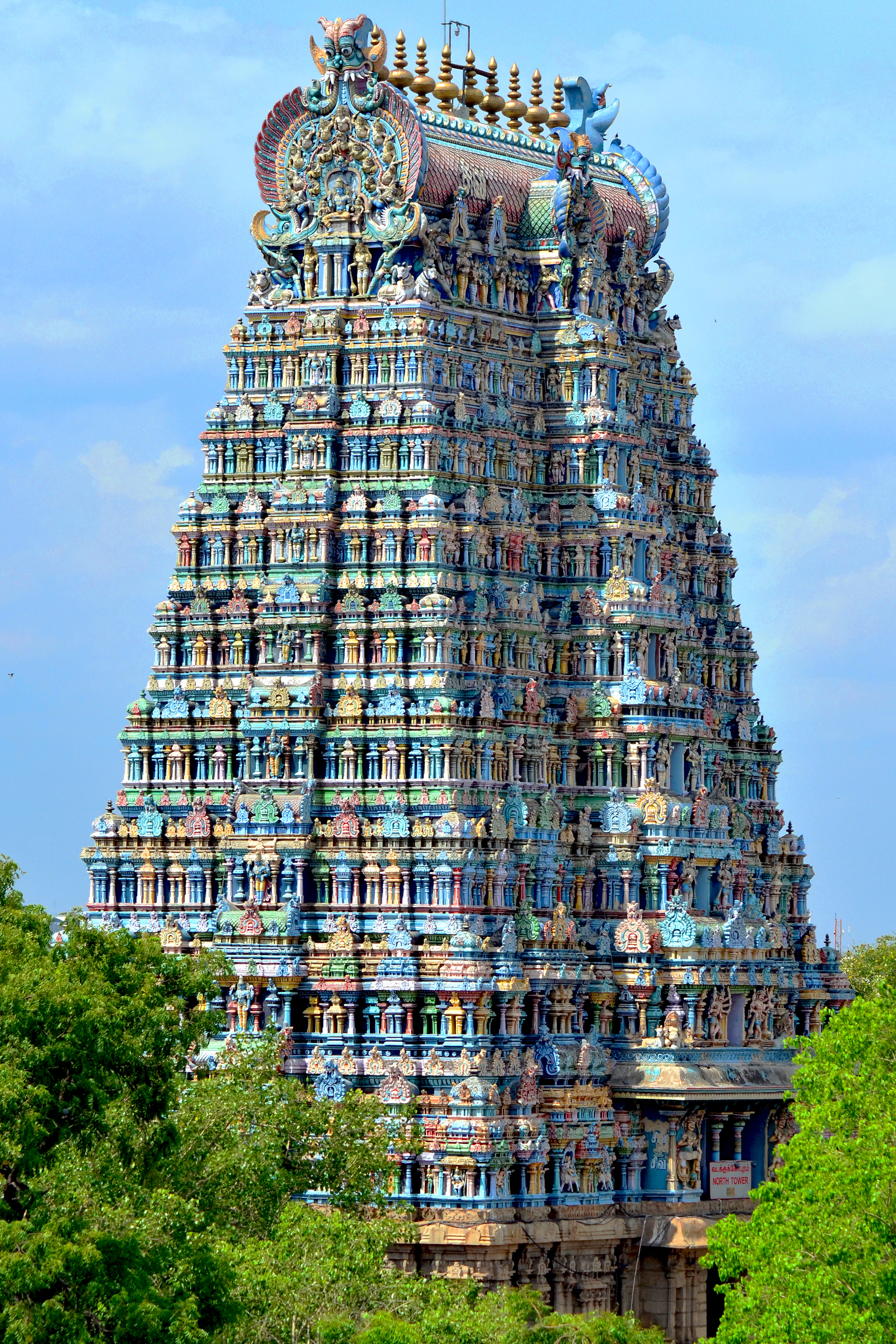
The gopurams consist of frescoes and sculptures

The tallest gopuram is the southern tower, built in the late 16th century CE, which rises to 170 ft (52 m). The gopuram is notable for its extensive artwork with over 1,500 mythological characters in panels that narrate legends from the Hindu texts such as the Puranas. The oldest gopuram is the eastern tower, which, along with portions of the three-storeyed gopuram at the entrance of Sundareswarar shrine, were built in the early 13th century CE. The Vembathurar gopuram near the Meenakshi shrine, and the Sundara Pandyan gopuram were added during the same period. The Chitra gopuram, added in the late 13th century, consists of various frescoes and reliefs from Hindu culture. These gopurams were largely destroyed in the 14th century and rebuilt later. The five storyed gopurams on both sides of the Sundareswarar shrine were added in the late 14th century CE.

The Nayaka gopuram and Palahai gopuram, which were built in the early 16th century, have similar style and architecture, and was likely built by a collaborating group of same artists. The five storeyed Kadaka Gopuram is situated in the western side of Meenakshi's shrine, and was renovated in the early 1960s. The Mottai gopuram (also called the North Raya gopuram), started during the 16th century CE, did not have a roof structure for nearly three centuries, before its completion in the 19th century. It is simpler and has fewer stucco images than the other major towers, giving it a relatively bald appearance and hence the local name. The Nadukkattu or Idaikattu gopuram, named as such due to its location between the two main shrines ("idai" or "nadu" meaning center in Tamil), is located near the Mukkuruni Vinayakar shrine. The Idabhakkuri gopuram is a five-storey tower in the northern segment of the temple.

=== Shrines ===
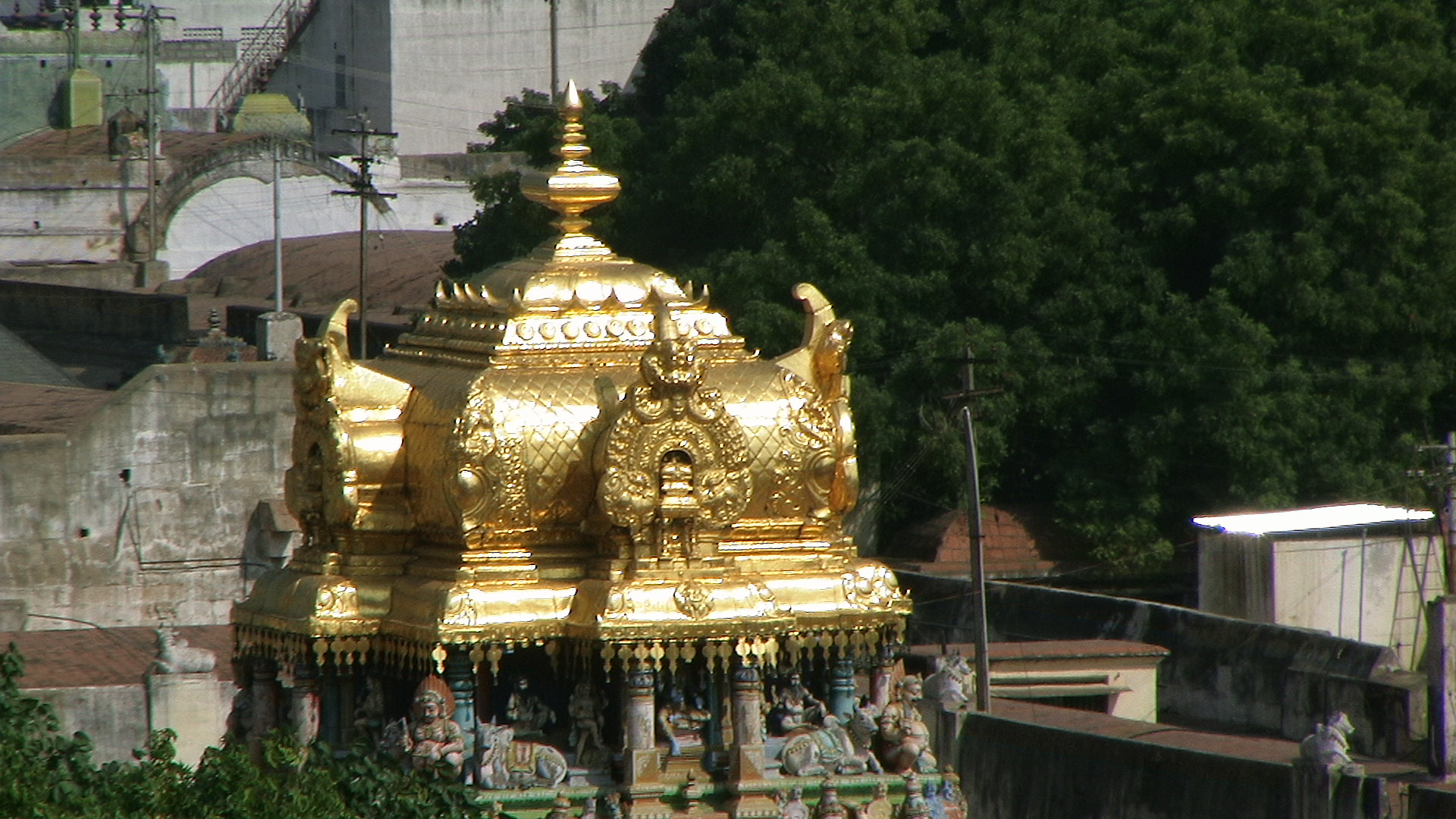
The gold-gilded vimana of the main sanctum housing Meenakshi

The separate shrines of Meenakshi and Sundareswarar are located in the inner prakara, and are open to the east. The Meenakshi shrine is more centrally placed and to the south or right of the Sundareswarar shrine. The central location and the right sided location, indicate that the goddess is the pradhana murti in the temple. The central sanctum (garbagriha) has a green stone image of Meenakshi, in a standing posture wih her legs slightly bent. Her right hand is raised and holds a lotus, on which sits a green parrot, while her left hand hangs by her side. A distinct feature of the iconography is the parrot, which is generally associated with Andal in Vaishnavism. A metal replica of Meenakshi is housed in the complex, and is used for festive processions.

The Sundareswarar (Note: His alternate names in texts and Madurai Meenakshi temple-related inscriptions include Chockalingam, Chockanathar, Meenakshi Sundarar, Somasundarar, Kalyana Sundarar, Shanbaga Sundarar, Attavai Shevagan, Adiyarku Nallan, Adhiraveesi, Vilayaduvan, Abhideka Chockar, Azhagiya Chockar, Kadambavana Chockar, Puzhugu Neidhu Chockar, Kadambavaneswarar, Karpoora Chockar, Madureswarar, Irayanar, Peralavayar.) shrine, located to the north of the Meenakshi shrine, is the largest within the temple complex and its entrance is aligned with the eastern gopuram. It has a lingam, which is shaded under a stone structure of a cobra situated inside a square sanctum. In the northeastern corner of the shrine is a stone image of his consort Meenakshi. During festive processions, Sundareswarar is represented by the anthropomorphic form of Somaskandar. A pair of metalic foot prints referred to as that of Chokkar (Siva), is kept in the Sundareswarar sanctum all day, and carried in a palanquin to Meenakshi's chamber every evening, so that the two symbolically spend the night together. In the morning, the temple volunteers perform puja to wake up the divine couple and the symbolic Chokkar image is carried back to the Sundareswarar sanctum.

There is a large sculpture of Vinayakar carved out of a single stone located just outside the Sundareswarar shrine. This deity is referred to as Mukkuruni Vinayakar, as three kurini (a measure) of rice is shaped into a ball and offered as a sacrifice to the deity. The temple has other shrines, dedicated to Murugan, Perumal (Vishnu), Kali, other Hindu deities in the outer prakaras.

=== Temple tank ===
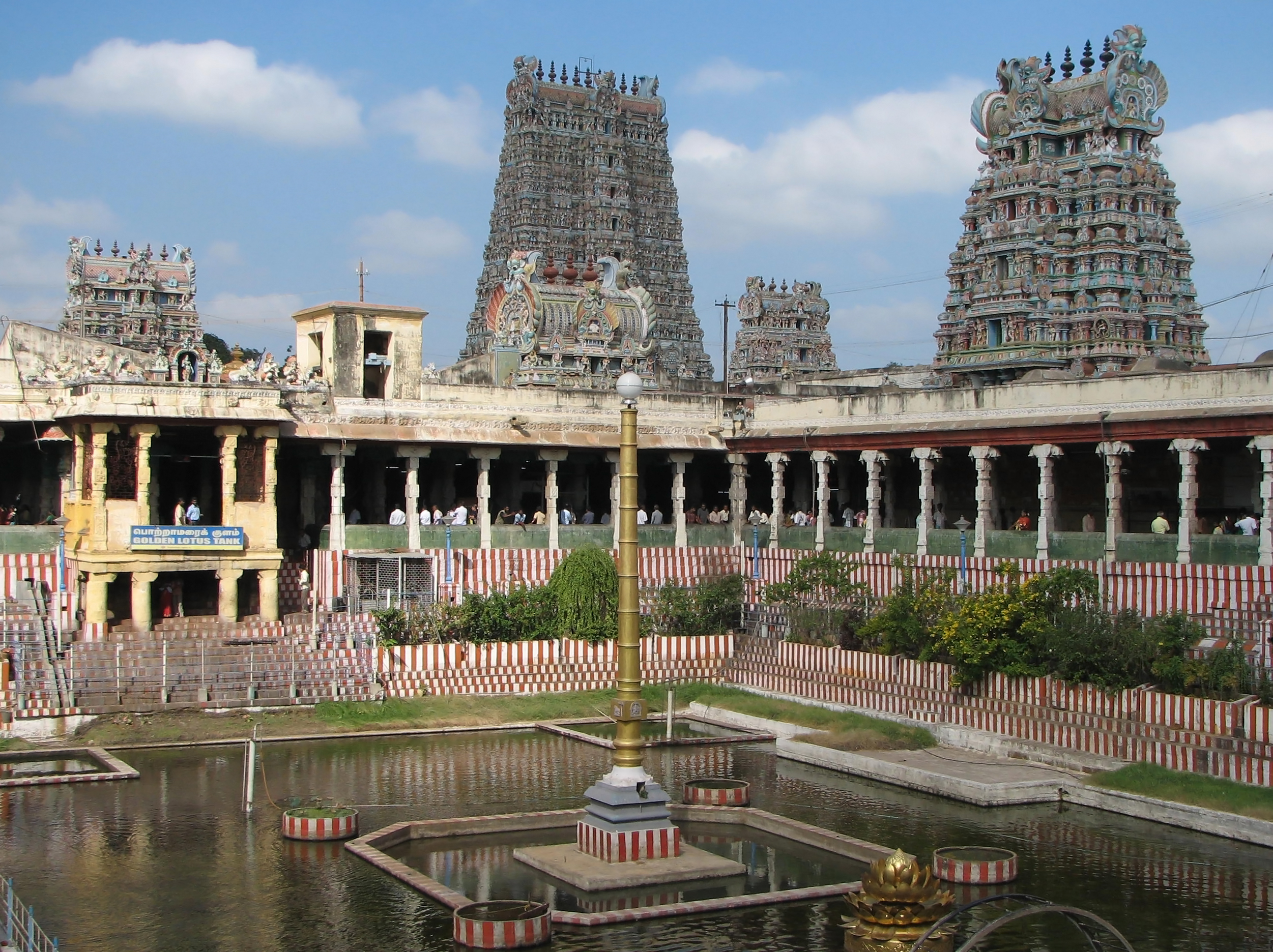
Potramarai Kulam (Golden lotus pond)

The sacred temple tank is called Porthamarai Kulam ("Golden lotus pond"), also known by other names such as Adhi Theertham, Sivaganga and Uthama Theertham. The pool measures 165 ft (50 m) by 120 ft (37 m) in size, with a gold-gilded image of a lotus in the middle of the pond.

The walls around the pool were painted with frescoes during the 17th and 18th centuries, of which only a fraction remains on the western side of the tank. The painting, executed on a red background with delicate black linework and large areas of white, green and ochre, depicts the marriage of Meenkashi and Sundareswarar, who are seated inside an architectural frame with a flowering tree in the background.

=== Mandapas ===
The temple complex has many mandapas (pillared-halls) built by kings and other patrons over the centuries. They are used to house various sculptures and as choultries for the pilgrims to rest.

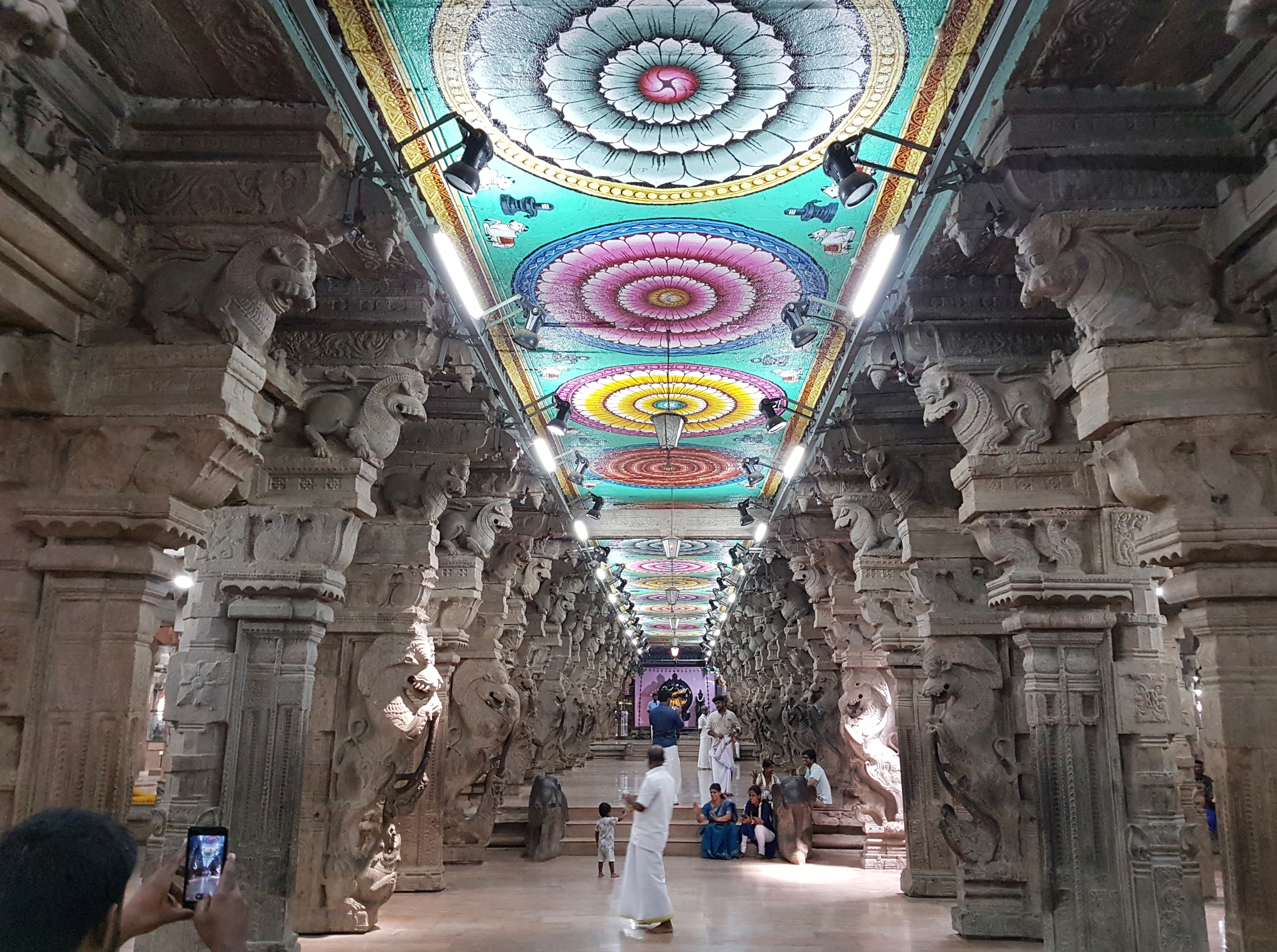
Ayiram kaal mandapa (thousand-pillared hall) consists of 985 carved pillars

The Ayiram kaal mandapam (thousand-pillared hall) consists of 985 carved pillars. It is situated to the north of the flag staff, and at the entrance of the hall is the statue of Ariyanatha Mudaliar, who oversaw the construction of the hall, seated on a horse-back, flanking one side of the entrance to the temple. The pillars in the hall have various carved sculptures of figures from Hindu mythology. The hall has two rows of pillars carved with images of Yali. It houses an art museum with various icons, photographs, drawings, and other exhibits about the temple. Outside the hall, towards the west, are the musical pillars, which produce a musical note, when stuck by an object.

The hundred-pillared Nayaka mandapa is located in the north-eastern part of the second prakaram and houses the Nataraja statue. The Nataraja statue, in a dance mudra, is seen with a raised right leg instead of the left leg typically found in Nataraja statues. The six-pillared unjal mandapam (swing mandapa) is located on the western bank of the golden lotus pond. It has a three-storied gopuram and is flanked by two Dvarapala statues. Supported by rectangular columns that bear lotus markings, the chamber houses various granite panels of the divine couple. It also houses a 1985 model of the entire temple complex. The images of Meenakshi and Sundareswarar are placed on a swing every Friday evening in this mandapa. The Kambathadi mandapa (H) consists of intricately carved sculptures of eight forms of Shiva–Ardhanarishvara, Rudra, Bhikshatana, Dakshinamurti, Lingodbhava, Ekapada, Rishaba, Somaskanda, Chandrasekara, Nataraja and Somasundara. The mandapa also has a statue of a seated Nandi, and a sculpture of Meenakshi thirukalyanam (the sacred marriage of Meenakshi). Other sculptures include those of Shiva and Kali engaged in a dance competition, a golden flagstaff, and Durga represented as Siddhidatri.

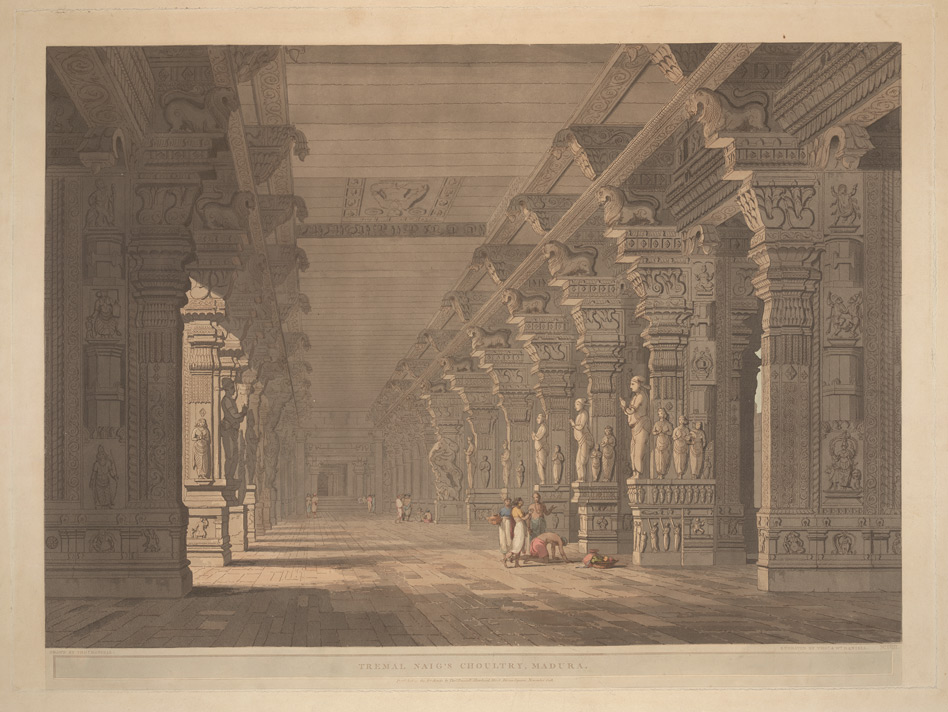
The Pudu mandapa situated outside the east gate of the Meenakshi temple

Ashta Shakthi mandapa (the hall of eight goddesses (O) is located near the east gopuram, between the main entrance and the gopuram leading to the Meenakshi shrine. It is named after the eight forms of goddess Shakti carved on its pillars: Koumari, Roudri, Vaishnavi, Mahalakshmi, Yagnarupini, Shyamala, Maheswari and Manonmani. Other sculptures and paintings depict events from Tiruvilayadal (holy games) of Shiva, and characters of Mahabharata. The hall also has four sculptures of Shiva scholars, as well as a statue of Mahatma Gandhi added in 1923. The Kilikoondu Mandapa (E), also called as Sangili mandapa, is located near the Meenakshi shrine. The name Kilikoondu means "parrot cage" in Tamil, and the mandapa was used to keep parrots in the past. In contemporary times, the mandapa is used to perform the kolattam, a dance form where dancers use sticks while forming chains with long ropes or chains hanging from the ceiling. These ropes gave the name Sangili mandapa, with sangili meaning "chain" in Tamil. The hall also houses sculptures of characters from the Mahabharata, and has a yali sculpture on a pillar, whose mouth houses a freely rotating stone ball. The Vasantha mandapa (or Pudu mandapa) is located in front of the eastern gopura, outside the walled complex. It houses 124 pillars, with sculptures depicting the Meenakshi thirukalyanam, images of Hindu deities such as Kali, Nataraja, Surya, and Chandra, and other events. The hall is occupied by shopkeepers, who often hide the view of the sculptures in the mandapa. The Golu mandapa is situated in the second corridor of the Meenakshi shrine at the western side. It is used during the Navaratri festival every year when the goddess Meenakshi is decorated in nine different forms on each of the nine days of the festival.

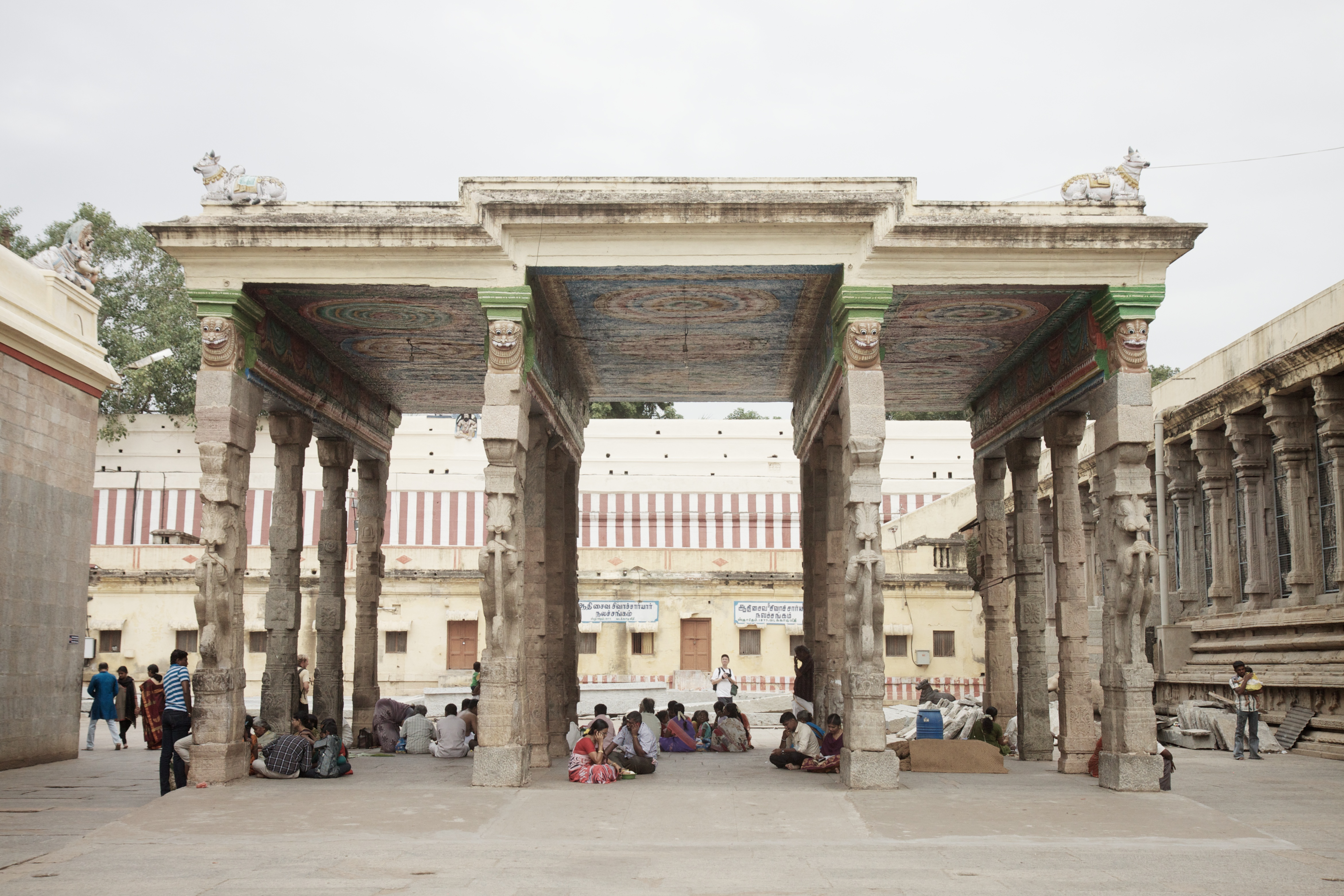
The small mandapas in the temple are used as resting places

The Vira vasantha mandapa (R) is located to the south of the thousand pillared hall, and consists of a large Nandi facing the Sundareswarar shrine. To the south of this hall is the kalyana mandapa (wedding hall), where the marriage of Meenakshi and Sundareswarar is celebrated every year in the month of Chithirai. The Urchava Nayanar mandapam is a small six-pillared mandapa in front of the Maha mandapa. The Dvarapala mandapa is located in front of the gopuram leading to the main shrines on the north colonnade of the golden lotus tank. The Iruttu mandapa is a wide and long hall, whose pillars are adorned with fine sculptures narrating the legend of Bhikshatana (Shiva). The Mangayarkarasi mandapa is situated opposite to the wedding hall and bears the name of queen Mangayarkarasi. To the south of this lies the Servaikarar mandapa. The Nagara mandapa (hall of beating drums) lies opposite to Sundareswarar shrine. Other mandapas include Vanniyadi Natarajar mandapa, Annakkuli mandapa, Murthiyamman mandapa, and Nandi mandapa. The halls also house the various courts of Shiva (Pancha sabhai). The Kanaka and Ratna sabhas are located in the first prahara, Rajata sabha in Velliambalam, Deva sabha in the hundred-pillared mandapa and Chitra sabha in the thousand-pillared mandapas.

== Worship and practices ==
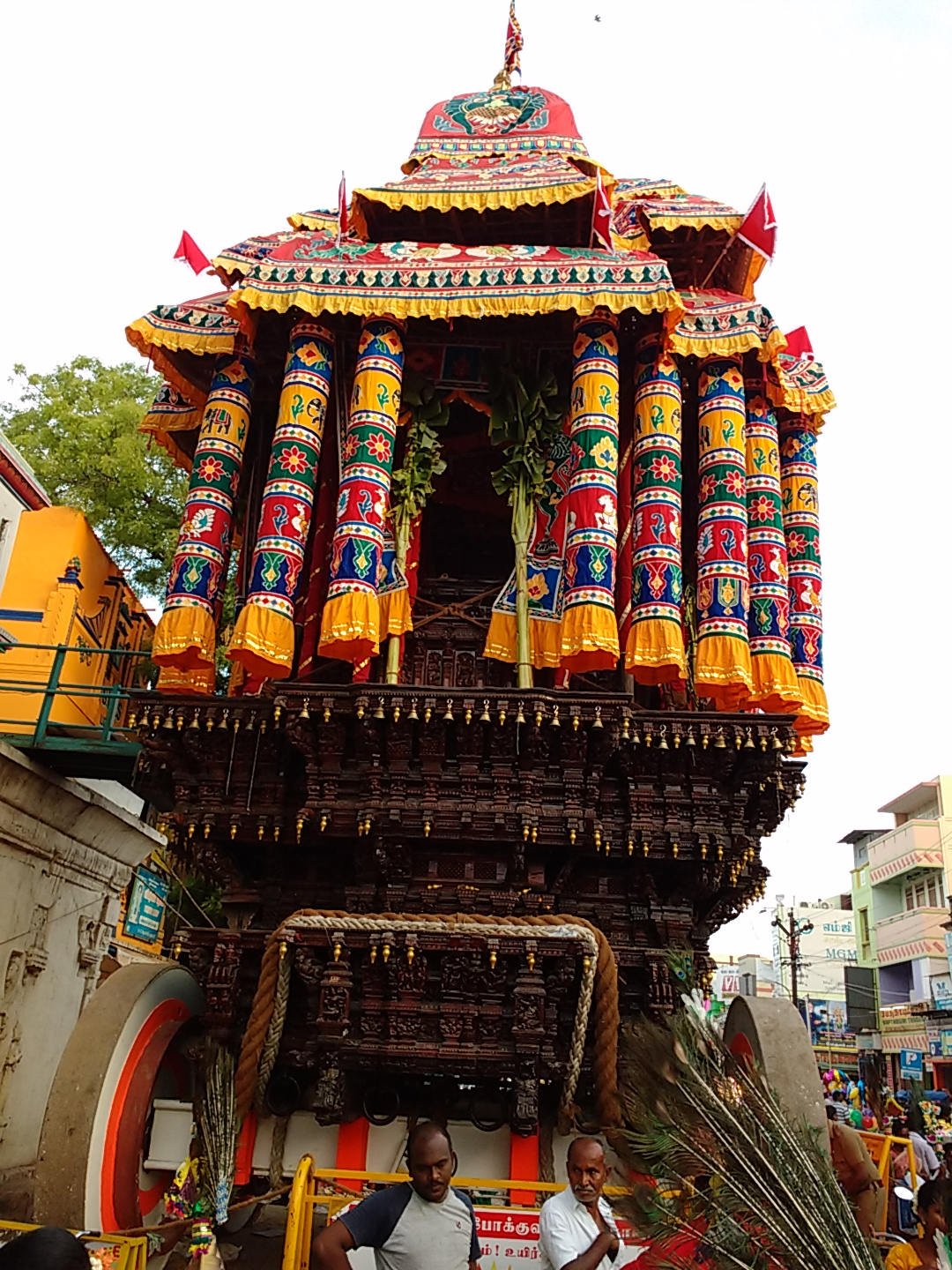
Rath yatra during a festival

Priests perform various pujas on a daily basis and during festivals. Volunteers and temple staff also participate in daily rituals, such as moving the icon of Sundareswarar between the sanctum chambers. The temple conducts six pujas everyday, each comprising four rituals namely abhisheka (sacred bath), alankaram (decoration), naivedanam (food offerings (Note: These offerings are always vegetarian, and animal sacrifices are never performed, states Christopher Fuller.)) and deepa aradanai (lamp ceremony) for both Meenakshi and Sundareswarar. The rituals and festivals are accompanied with music from instruments such as nadhaswaram (pipe instrument), davandai and tavil (percussion instrument), often along with the recitation of the Vedas. The Hindus circumambulate the shrines clockwise before entering the shrine for a darshana. The Meenakshi shrine is typically visited before the Sundareswarar shrine by the pilgrims, as she is considered the primary deity of the complex.

During festivities, a temple car (ratha) is taken on a procession in the streets around the temple. It carries metal icons of the gods kept exclusively for this purpose. The temple car is decorated with colorful clothes and flowers, and volunteers pull the car, while circumambulating the temple complex on the concentric roads around the temple. As per Fuller, these processions symbolize Meenakshi's position as a ruler and her presence among the people. The procession reflects the traditional matrilineal social values, and the warrior goddess worship tradition that dramatically expanded after the 14th-century.

=== Festivals ===
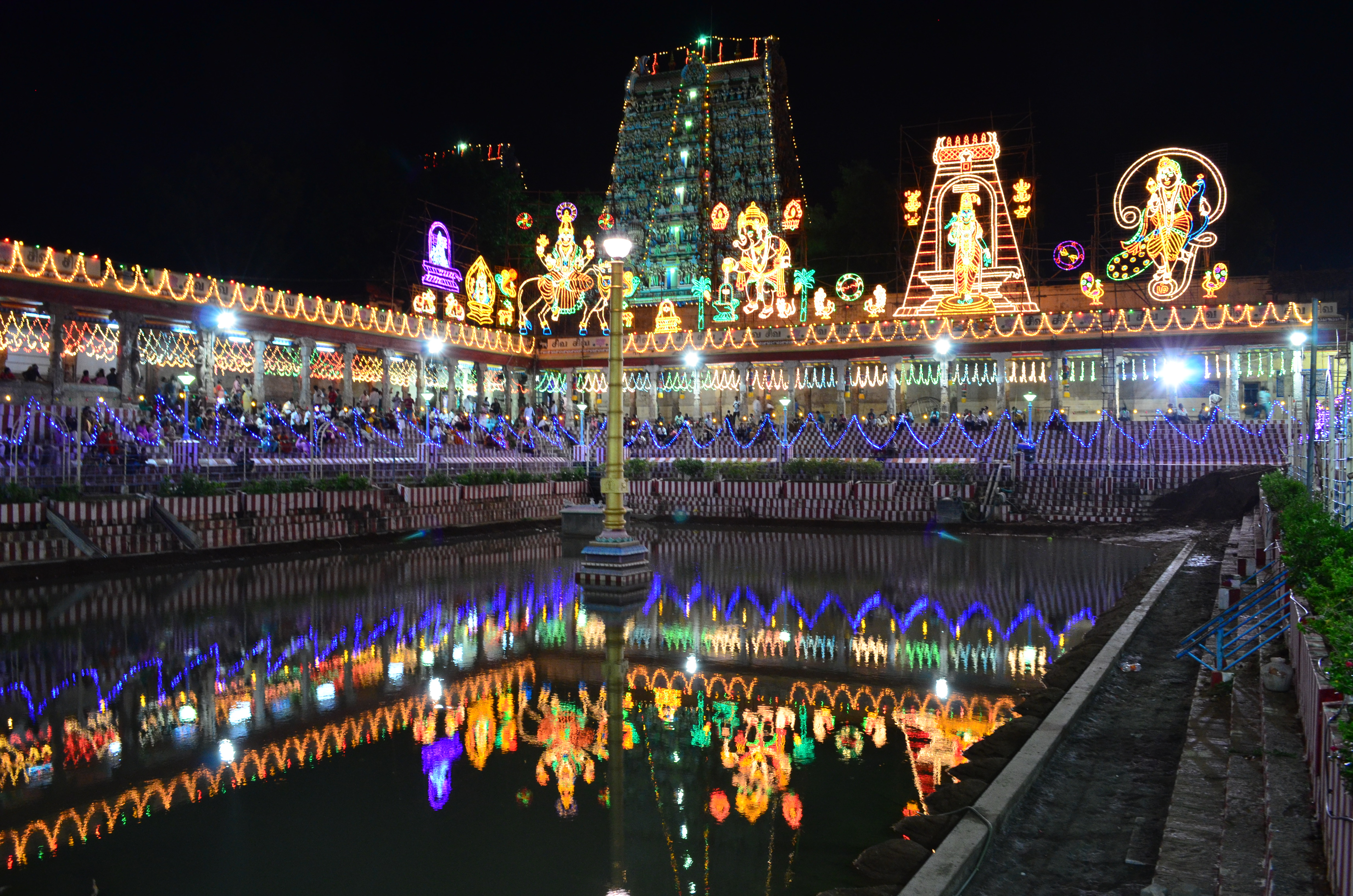
Meenakshi temple illuminated during the Navaratri festival

The Meenakshi temple hosts a festival in each month of the Tamil calendar. The Meenakshi thirukalyanam, which celebrates the wedding of Meenakshi and Sundareswarar, is celebrated over 15 days, and is the most attended festival. The festival, celebrated during the month of Chithirai, is part of the Chithirai Thiruvizha. The festivities include number of events such as the Ther Thiruvizha (temple car festival) and Theppa Thiruvizha (float festival). The wedding of the divine couple is regarded as an instance of a South Indian wedding with matrilineal emphasis, an arrangement referred as "Madurai marriage", which is in contrast with the "Chidambaram marriage", with patrilineal emphasis, named after the rituals at the Nataraja temple at Chidambaram. The festival includes the wedding ritual, where Alagar (Vishnu) gives away his sister Meenakshi, the royal bride, in marriage to Shiva, and a procession, where the idols of Meenakshi and Sundareswarar are taken in a temple car, pulled by volunteering devotees.

In most Shakti temples in Tamil Nadu, the Fridays during the Tamil months of Aadi (July–August) and Thai (January–February) are considered auspicious days. Avani Moola utsavam, celebrated in Avani, is a 10-day festival devoted to Sundareswarar, which celebrates his various Thiruvilayadal (sacred games). Navaratri is celebrated during the month of Purattasi. During this festival, the temple complex is lit up at night with colorful lights, and golu is displayed in the golu mandapa. These displays, depicting scenes from Hindu mythology, are popular with children, and attract a large number of people. Other festivals include the Vasantham festival celebrated in the month of Vaikasi, Unjal Festival in Aani, Mulai-Kottu festival in Aadi, Kolattam festival in Aipasi and Karthigai, Thiruvathira (Arudra Darisanam) in Margazhi, Thai utsavam in Thai, Masi utsavam in Masi, and Vasamtha utsavam in Panguni.
