= Choultry =

Hotel type in India

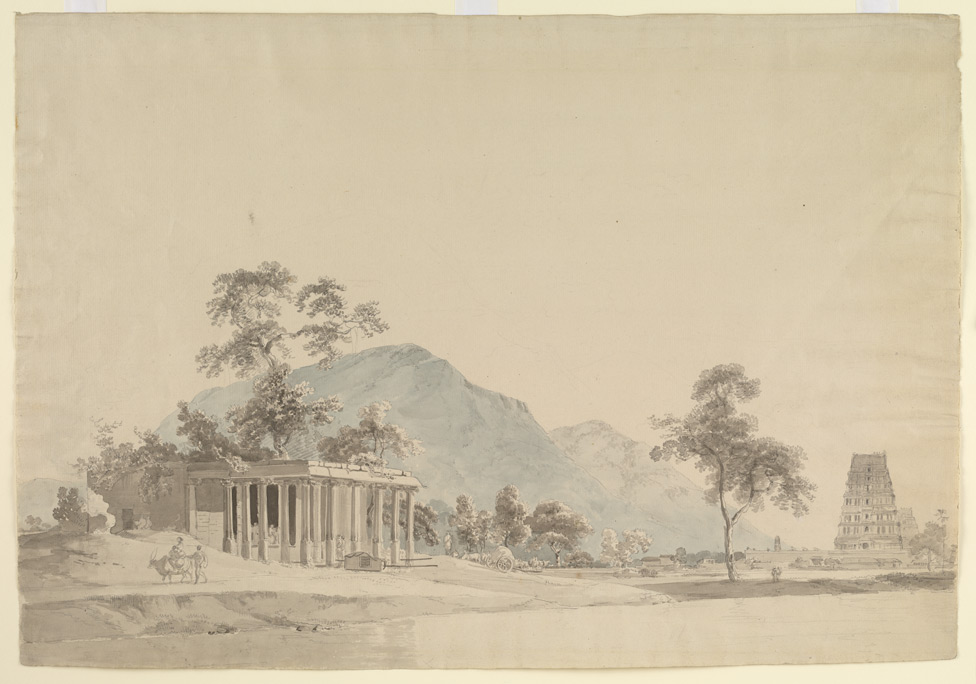
A 1792 painting of a Hindu temple and choultry (a travelers' rest house)

Choultry is a resting place, an inn or caravansary for travelers, pilgrims or visitors to a site, typically linked to Buddhist, Jain and Hindu temples. They are also referred to as chottry, choultree, chathra, choltry, chowry, chawari, chawadi, choutry, chowree or tschultri.

This term is more common in South India, Central India and West India, while in North India similar facilities are called Dharmshalas. They are known as a chatra, satram, chatram or dharmasala in eastern regions of India. The choultry concept and infrastructure in South Asia dates back to at least the 1st millennium, according to epigraphical evidence such as stone and copper plate inscriptions.

A choultry provides seating space, rooms, water and sometimes food financed by a charitable institution. Its services are either at no cost, or nominal rates, or it is up to the visitor to leave whatever they wish as a donation. They were also used by officials traveling on public business. Many major temples have mandapam and pillared halls, some called Thousand pillared halls with an attached kitchen for servicing pilgrims and travelers to the temple. The term choultry may overlap with a mandapa. Many Hindu monasteries (matha) also built and operated such choultries.

== Etymology ==
In Telugu and Tamil chaawadi, [tsavadi, chau, Skt. chatur, 'four,' vata, 'road, a place where four roads meet]. Alternatively, it is derived from chatra (छत्र) which means "umbrella, cover", or 'shraaya (श्राय) which means shelter. The word satram (సత్రం, സത്രം) is used for such buildings in the Telugu states and in Kerala and chhatra (ಛತ್ರ) in Kannada. In West India the form used is chowry or chowree (Dakhan. chaori). A pillared hall, a shed, or a simple loggia, used by travellers as a resting-place.

== Other usages ==
In South India, especially in Karnataka a choultry can also denote a Hindu wedding hall.

== Gallery ==
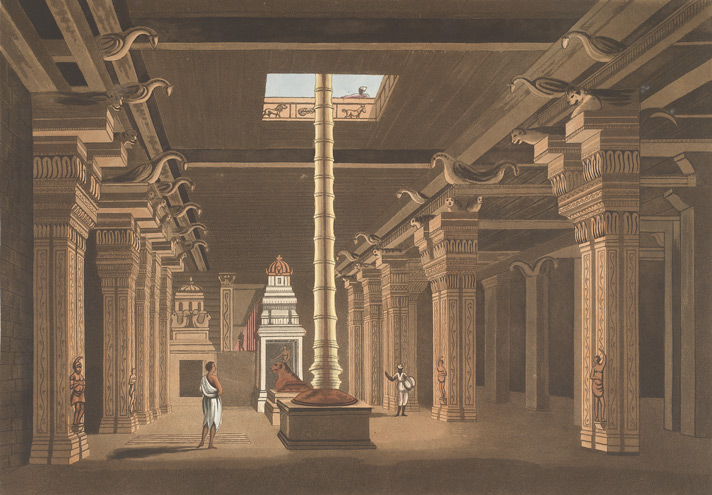
A Madurai Hindu temple choultry

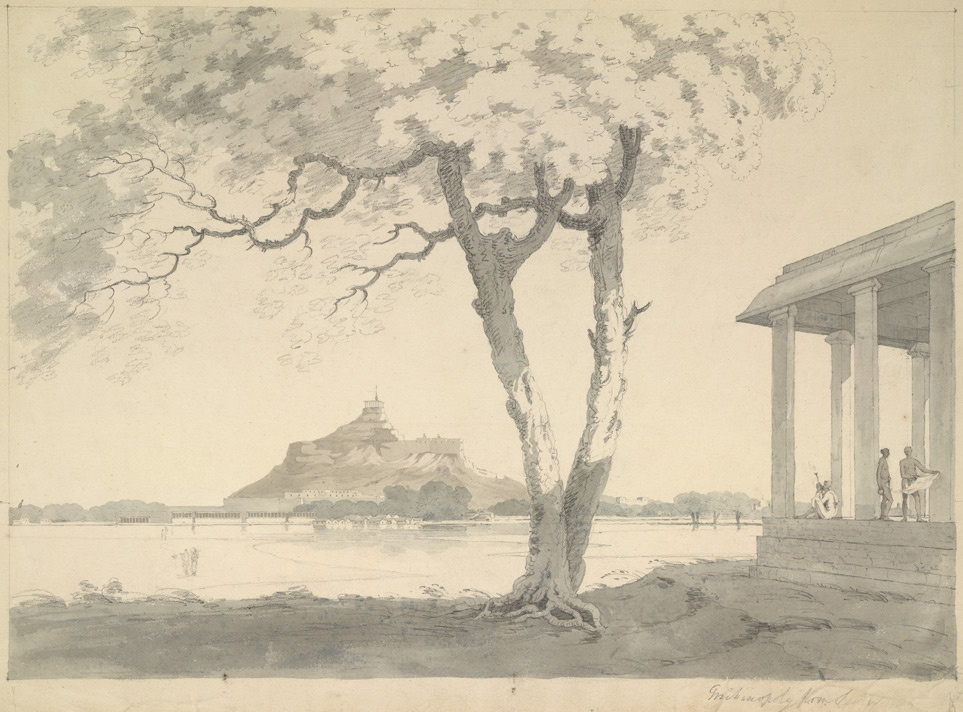
A Srirangam temple choultry

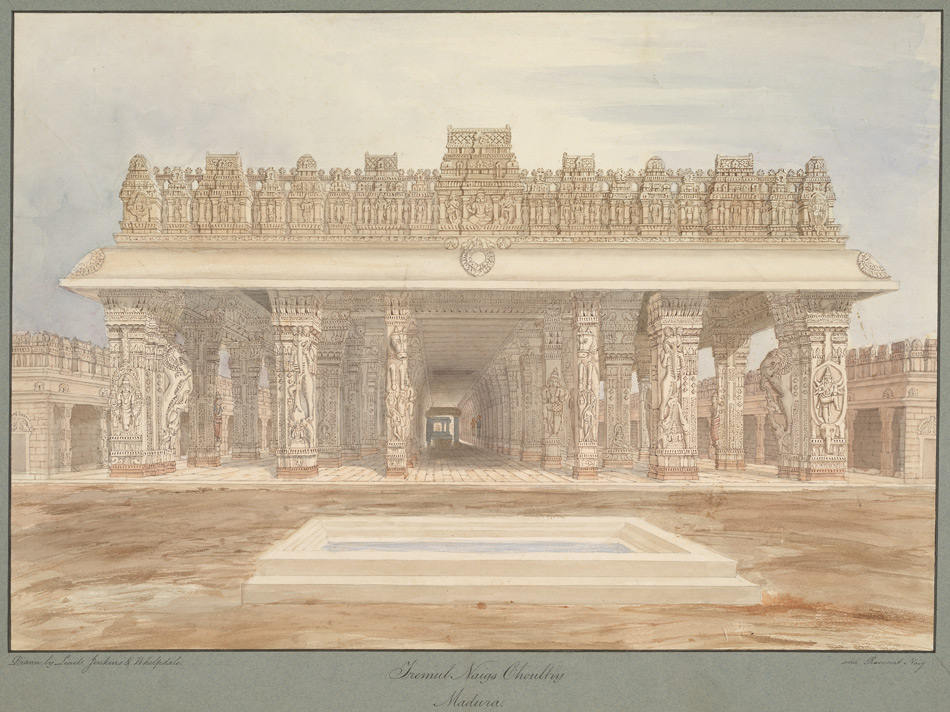
A choultry built during the Nayaka dynasty rule in Tamil Nadu

== See also ==
- Caravanserai
- Colonnade
