= Vira (given name) =

Vira is a given name. Notable people with the name include:

- Vira Ageyeva (born 1958), Ukrainian literary critic and philologist
- Vira Alakesvara of Gampola, king of Gampola
- Vira Bahu II of Gampola, king of Gampola
- Vira Chorny-Meshkova (born 1963), Ukrainian poet and translator
- Vira Jotava, Indian politician
- Vira Lozinsky (born 1974), Israeli-Moldovan musician and Yiddish language singer
- Vira Misevych (1945–1995), Soviet-Ukrainian equestrian
- Vira Narasimha II (1220–1234), king of the Hoysala Empire
- Vira Ramanatha (1263–1295), king of the Hoysala Empire
- Vira Sathidar (1958-2021), Indian poet, actor, editor
- Vira Silenti (1931–2014), Italian actress
- Vira Someshwara (1234–1263), king of the Hoysala Empire
- Vira Ulianchenko (born 1958), Ukrainian politician and activist
- Vira Ravi Ravi Varma (died 1504), raja of Venad
- Vira Varma, prince of Kottayam
- Vira Vovk (born 1926), Ukrainian-language writer, critic and translator
- Vira Boarman Whitehouse (1875–1957), American suffragette, government official, and businessperson
- Vira Zozulya (born 1970), Ukrainian race walker
