= Harihareshwara Temple =

Coordinates: 14°30′42″N 75°48′07″E

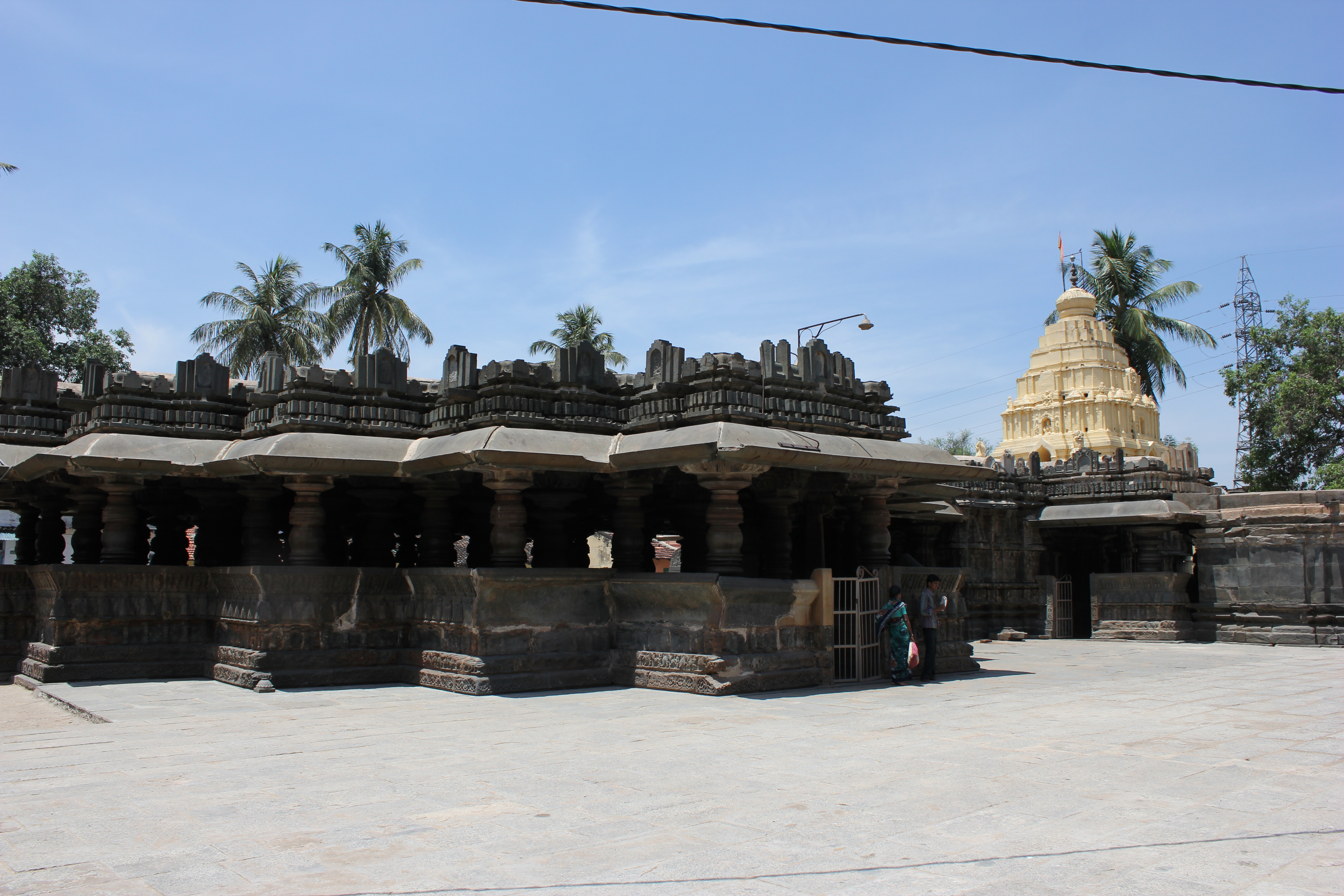

Religion
- Affiliation: Hinduism
- District: Davanagere
- Deity: Harihara

Location
- Location: Harihar
- State: Karnataka
- Country: India
- Interactive map of Harihareshwara Temple

Architecture
- Type: Hoysala architecture
- Creator: Vira Narasimha II

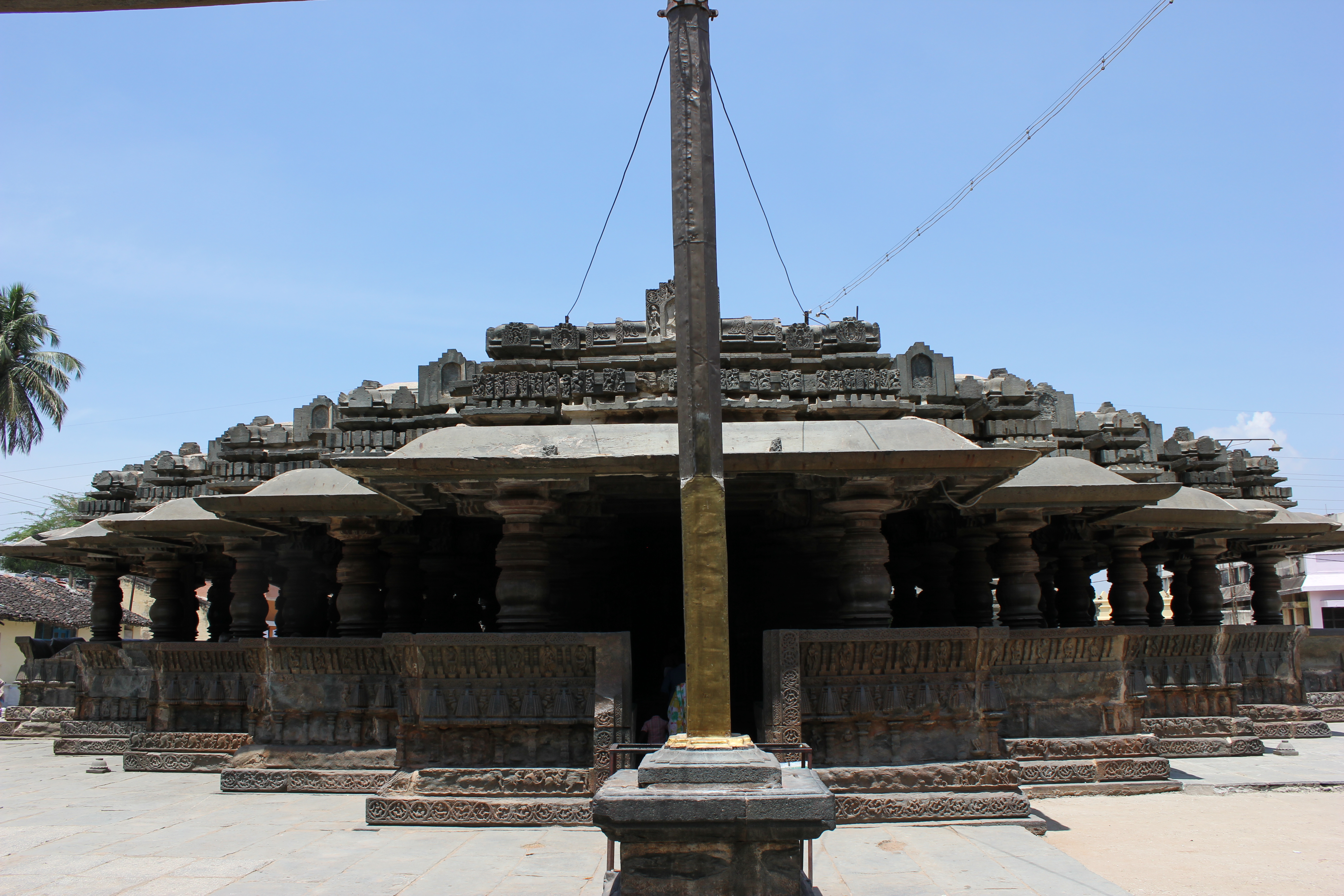
staggered square plan of open mantapa (hall) at the Harihareshwara temple at Harihar

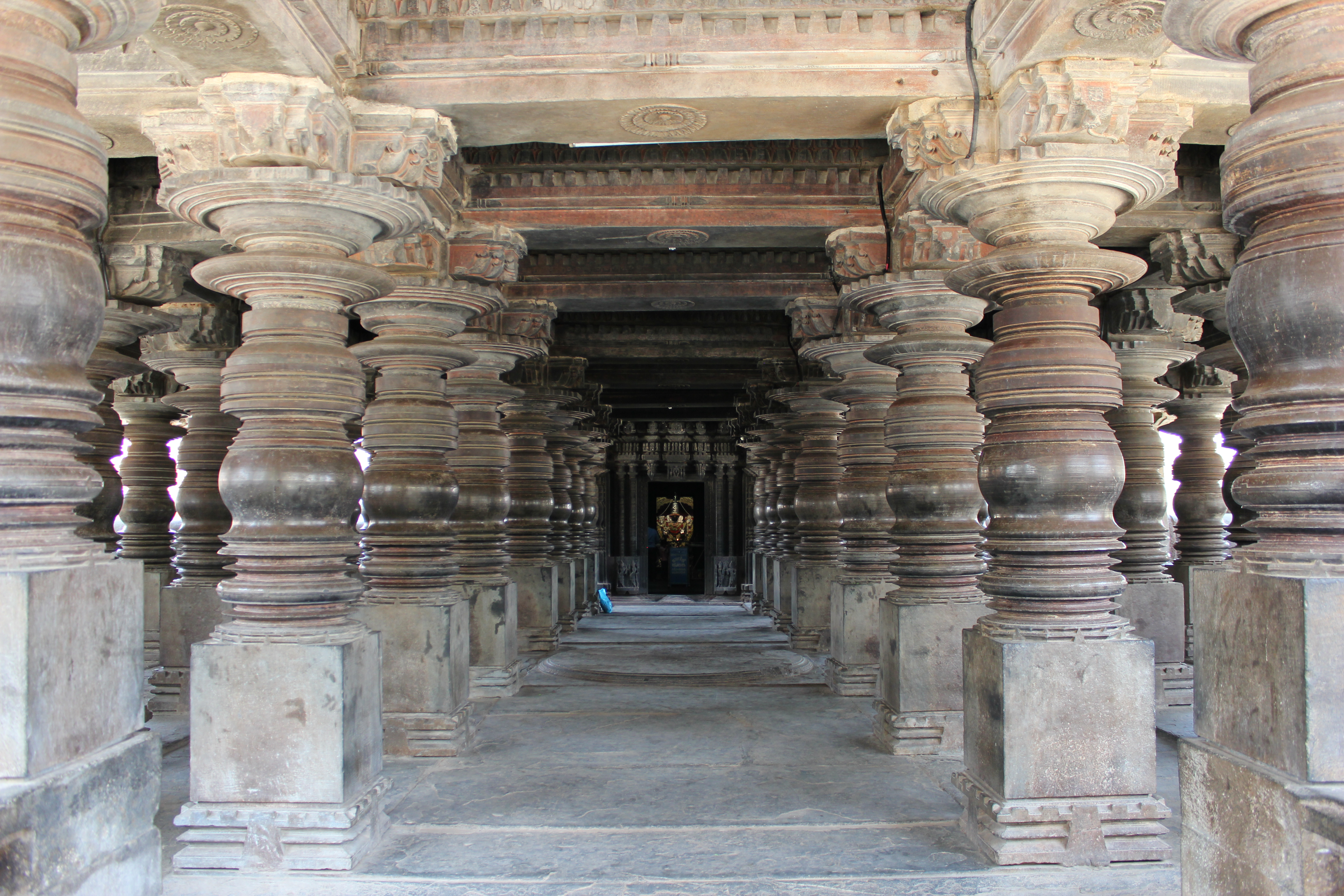
Open hall with lathe turned pillars of Harihareshwara temple (1224 CE) in Hoysala architectural style

Harihareshwara Temple is a Hindu temple situated in Harihar, Karnataka state, India. The temple was built in c. 1223–1224 CE by Polalva, a commander and minister of the Hoysala Empire King Vira Narasimha II. In 1268 CE, Soma, a commander of King Narasimha III of the same dynasty made some additions. The temple houses the deity Harihara, a fusion of the Hindu gods Vishnu and Shiva. The image of the deity is a fusion of the right vertical half of Shiva and the left vertical half of Vishnu. The image holds in its right hand, the attributes of Shiva and in the left hand, those of Vishnu.

== Legend ==
According to a Hindu legend, a demon named Guha (or Guhasura) once lived in these parts and a considerable surrounding region, from Uchchangi Durga in the east, Govinahalu in the south, Mudanur in the west, and Airani in the north was under his control. Guha successfully appeased Hindu god Brahma with his penance and obtained a boon, by virtue of which, it would be impossible for either Hari (Vishnu) or Hara (Shiva) to singly kill him. Guha then became a regular tormentor of gods and humans alike. In order to overcome Brahma's boon and eliminate Guha, Vishnu and Shiva together took the form of Harihara (a fusion), came down to earth, and killed the demon. The descent of the incarnation on earth is said to be at nearby Kudalur, at the confluence of the rivers Tungabhadra and Haridra.

== Temple plan ==
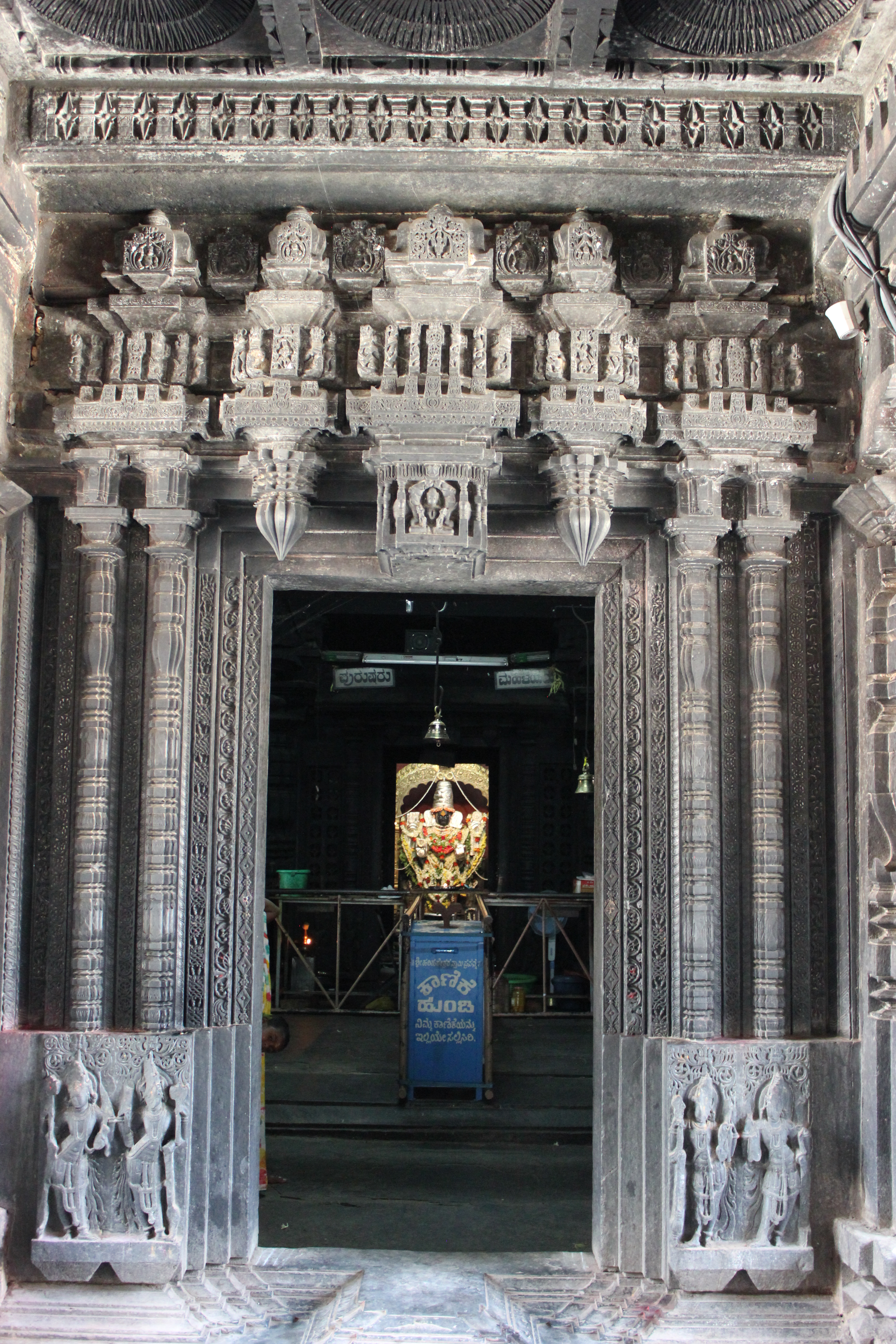
Ornate lintel and door jamb relief at entrance to inner mantapa in the Harihareshwara temple at Harihar

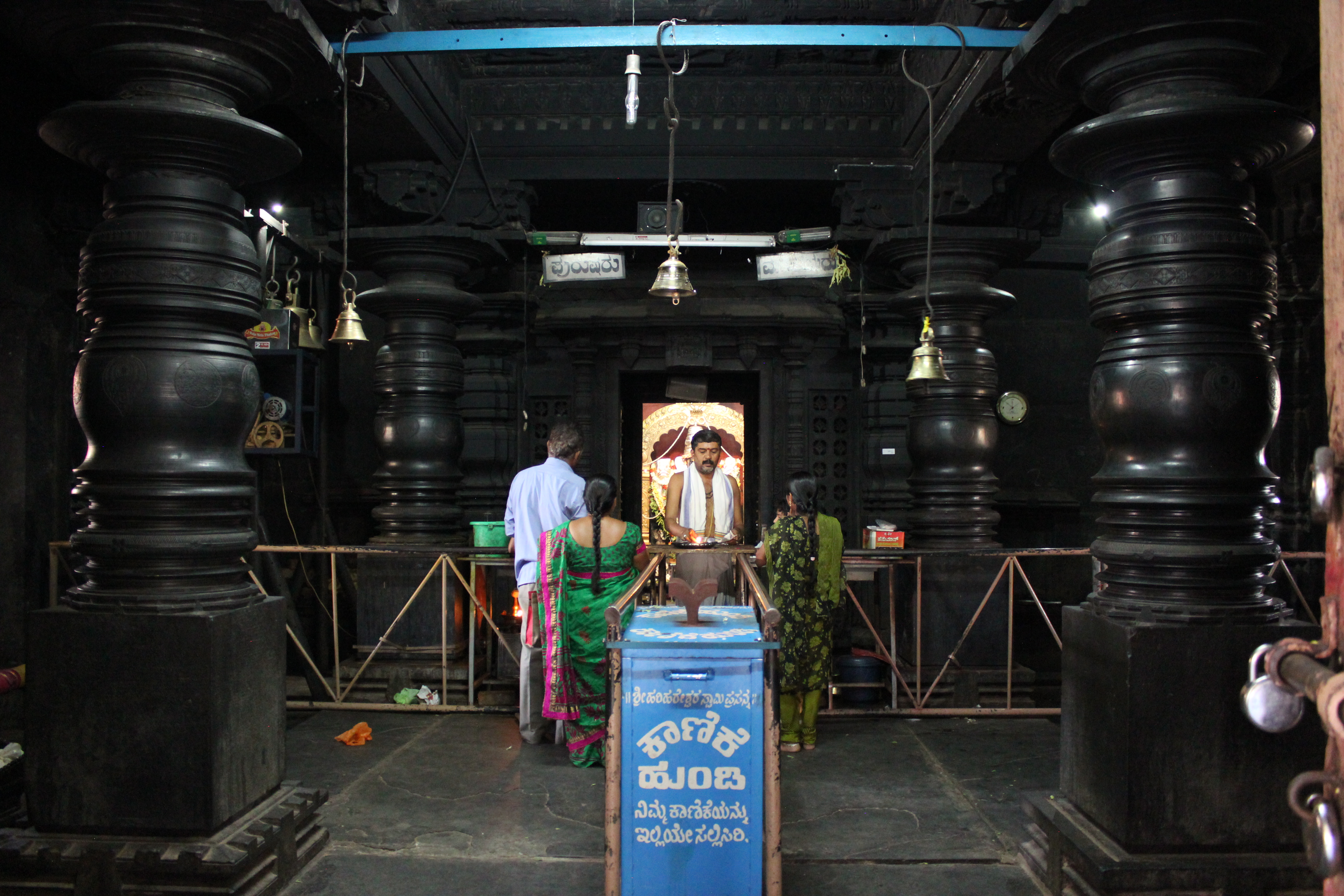
Lathe turned pillars support the bay ceiling of the closed hall leading to the sanctum

The temple is constructed in a staggered square mantapa (hall) plan, typical of Hoysala constructions. Therefore, the outer wall of the mantapa shows many projections and recesses. The wall of the mantapa is a parapet wall resting on which are half pillars that support the outer ends of the roof (cornice). The ceiling of the open mantapa is adorned with artistic decoration such as lotuses. The ceiling is supported by lathe turned full pillars. The material used for the temple is soapstone (also called potstone). The original tower over the shrine (Vimana) is missing and has been replaced in modern times with one of brick and mortar. Preserved within the temple premises are several old-Kannada inscriptions and hero stones.

== Gallery ==
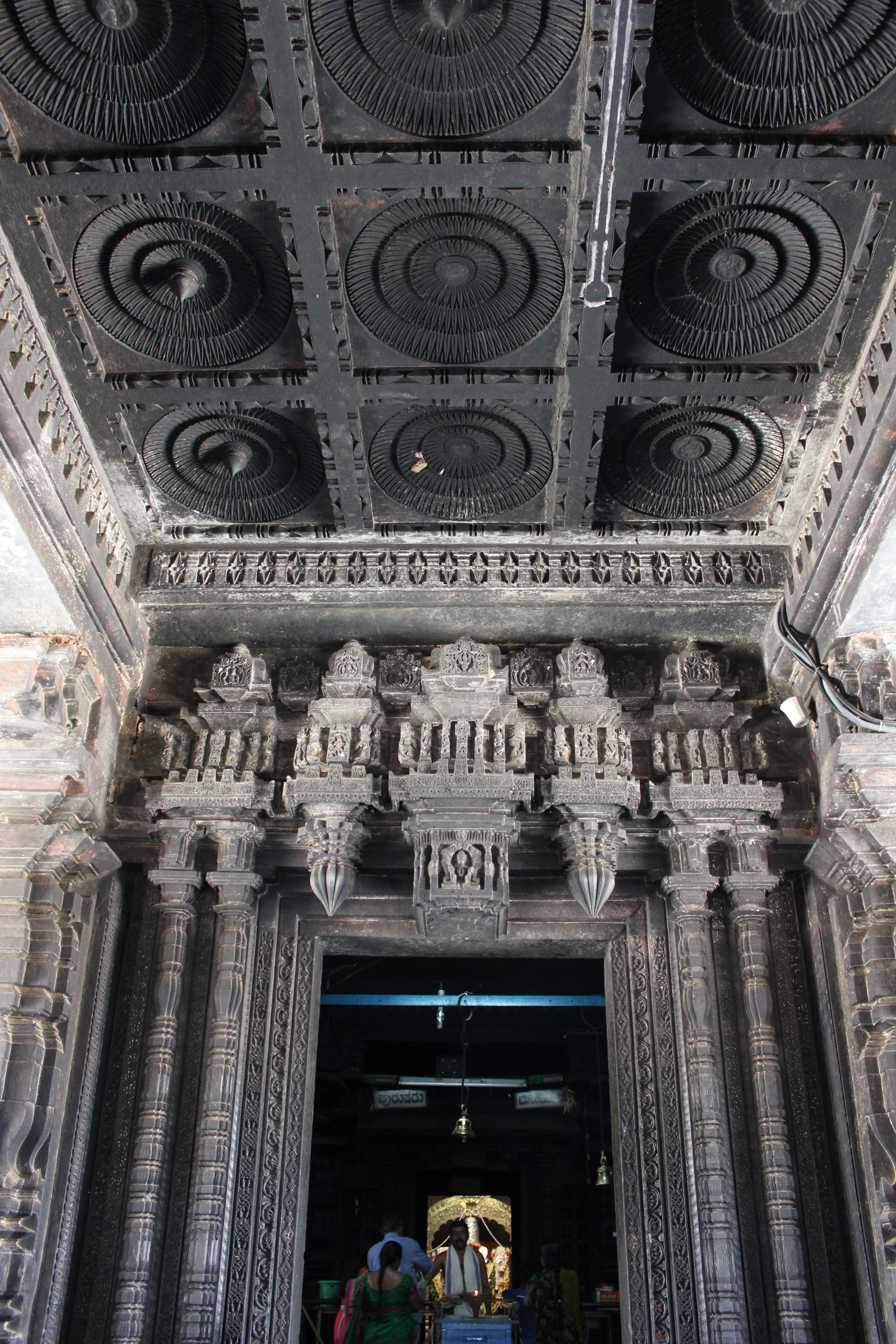
Ornate lintel, door jamb and ceiling relief at entrance to inner mantapa in the Harihareshwara temple at Harihar

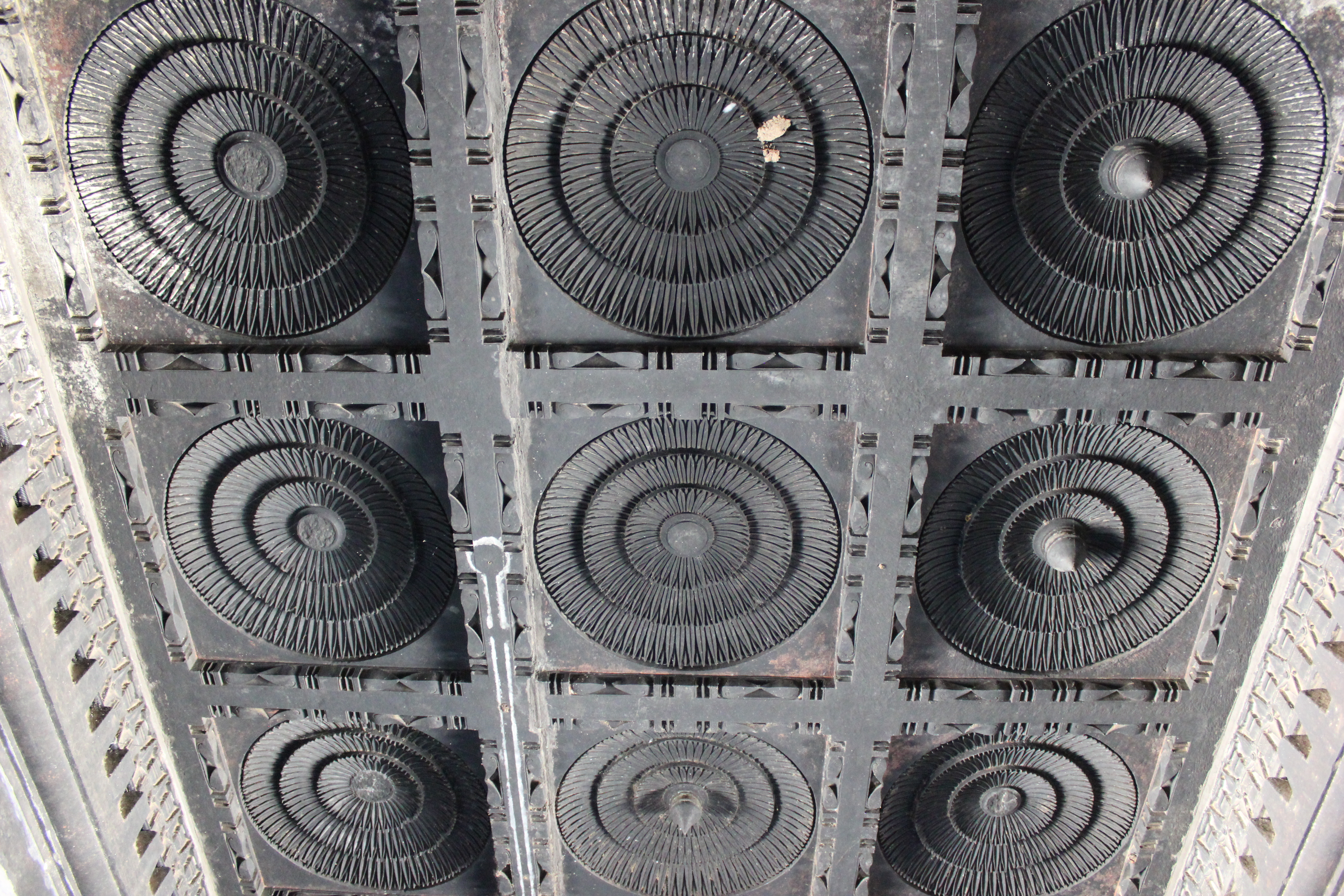
Ceiling relief in outer mantapa in the Harihareshwara temple at Harihar

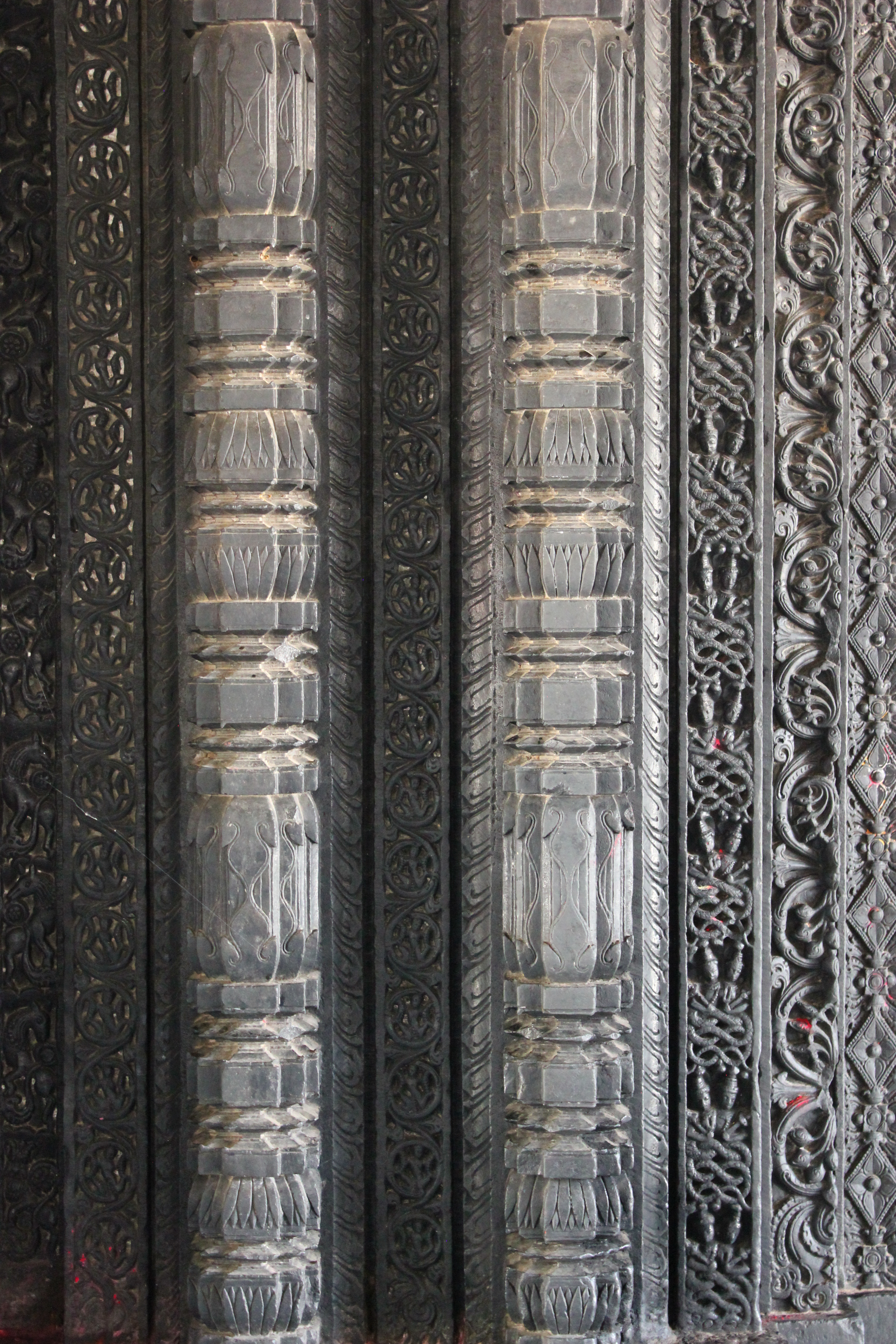
Ornate door jamb relief at entrance to inner mantapa in the Harihareshwara temple at Harihar

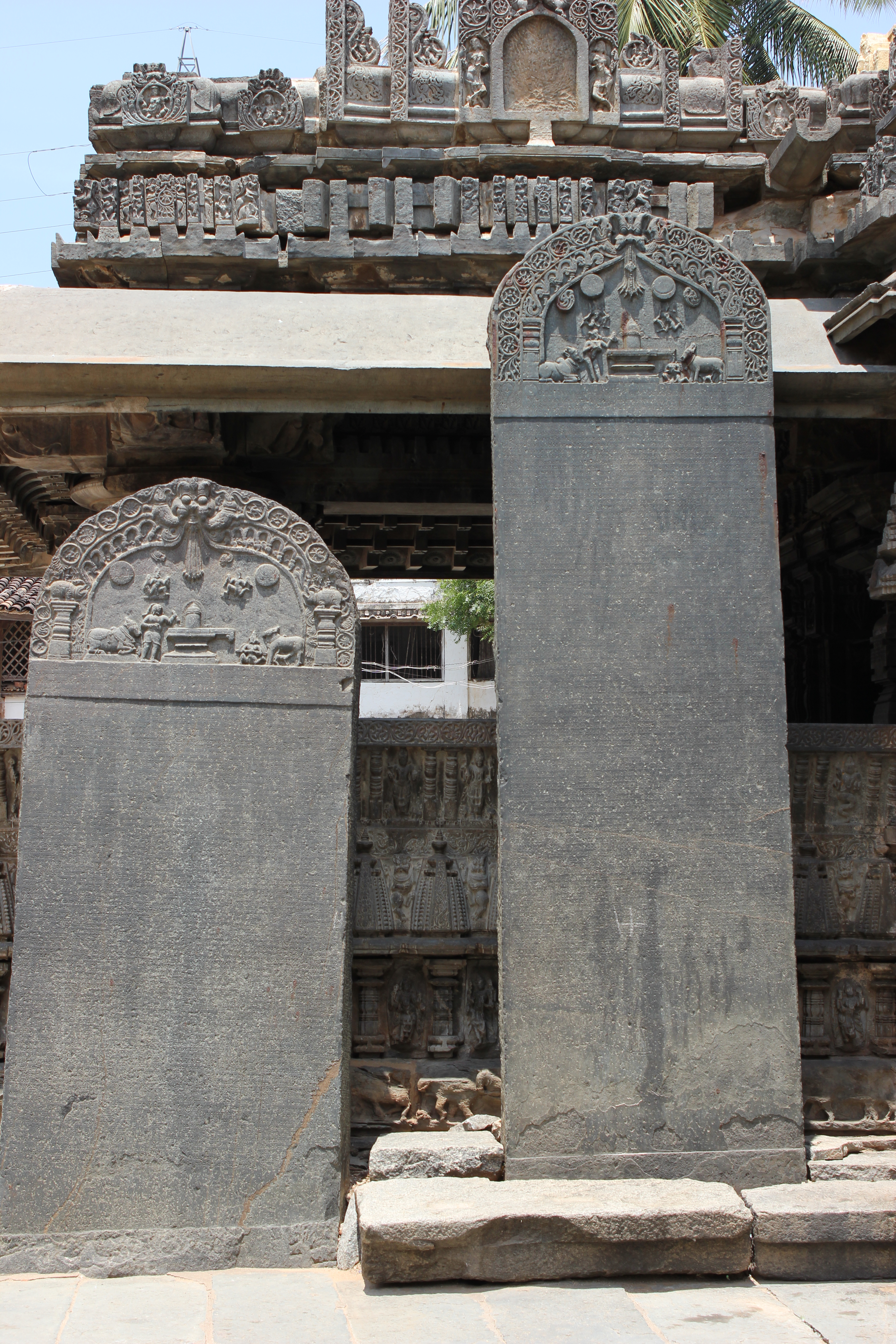
Old Kannada inscriptions dated c.1171 (l) and c.1223 (r) in the Harihareshwara temple at Harihar

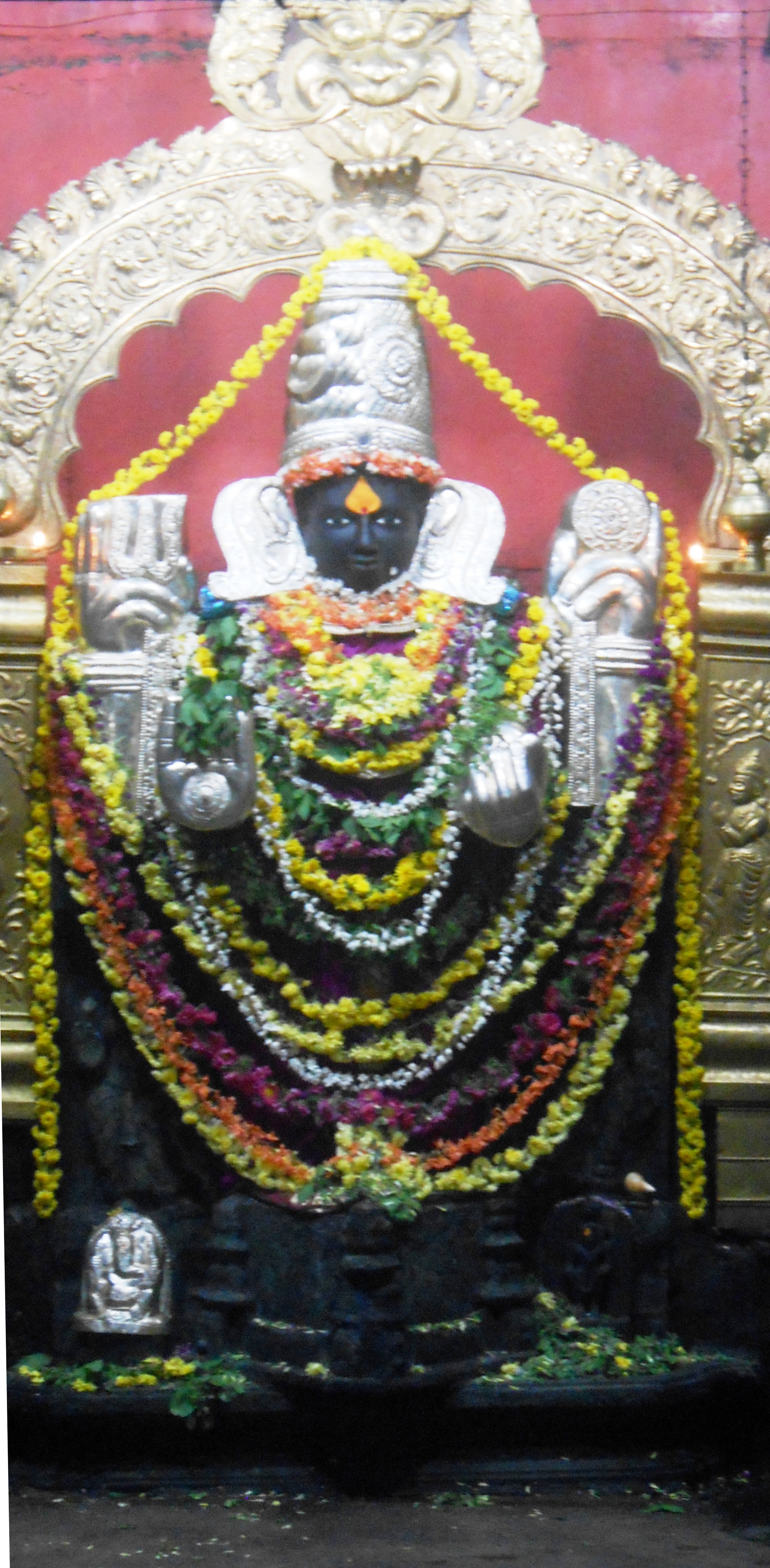
Image of the Hindu god Harihara in the sanctum
