= Maravarman Sundara Pandyan I =

Pandyan emperor from 1216 to 1238

Pandyan Emperor
- Reign: 1216–1238
- Predecessor: Jatavarman Kulasekara Pandyan
- Successor: Maravarman Sundara Pandyan II

Maravarman Sundara Pandyan I was a Pandyan king, who ruled regions of southern India between 1216–1238 CE. He laid the foundation for the Pandya revival, after being dominated by the Cholas for several centuries.

== Accession ==
Sundara Pandyan came to power in 1216 CE after the death of his elder brother Jatavarman Kulasekara Pandyan. Kulasekara Pandyan was a vassal of the Chola King Kulothunga Chola III. He had opposed and been defeated by Kulothunga Chola III in 1205 CE, when the victorious Chola armies burned down the ancient Pandyan coronation hall in Madurai. This sowed the seed for revenge when Sundara Pandyan took power.

== War against the Cholas ==
To avenge his brother's humiliation in the hands of Kulothunga Chola III, Sundara Pandyan invaded the Chola kingdom soon after his accession. Kulothunga Chola III was nearing the end of his long 40-year reign and was hampered by old age and the swiftness of the Pandyan invasion. Sundara Pandyan sacked the Chola cities of Thanjavur and Uraiyur and drove both the Chola king and his crown prince Rajaraja Chola III into exile. To celebrate his victory he performed a virabisheka (lit. anointment of heroes) in the coronation hall of Cholas (mudikondasolapuram) at Ayirattali in Thanjavur district. Later he marched his armies up to Chidambaram and camped at Pon Amaravathi. He commemorated his victories over the Cholas by conducting a Thulabaram (Tamil: துலாபாரம்) - a form of Hindu worship where the devotee offers tribute in equal measure to his weight - at the Chidambaram temple.

Kulothunga Chola III appealed for aid to his son-in-law, the Hoysala monarch Veera Ballala II. Ballala sent an army under his son, the crown prince Vira Narasimha II. Buckling under the Hoysala threat Sundara Pandyan agreed to restore the Chola kingdom to Kulothunga, but only after the Cholas acknowledged his suzerainty. Sundara Pandyan's victories over Cholas are described in the Thirukkolur (in present-day Tirunelveli district) inscriptions.

== Second Pandyan Empire ==
Kulothunga made his formal submission to Pandyan rule in 1217 CE at Pon Amaravathi, ending nearly three centuries of Chola domination in the Tamil country and other major parts of South India. This was the beginning of the Pandyan revival and the second Pandyan empire was born and between 1215-1345 AD the Pandyas were the paramount power in South India. During the following five decades from 1215 AD, following their defeat to the Pandyas, the Cholas experienced a constant decline in terms of extent of territory, political importance, prestige and remained largely subordinate and subservient to the Pandyas. The Cholas also became dependent on the Hoysalas with whom they had marital relations. Kulothunga Chola III died in 1218 CE, shortly after his defeat by Maravarman Sundara Pandyan and his son successor Rajaraja Chola III proved to be an incapable and incompetent ruler under whose rule the Chola kingdom hurtled from one ignominy to the other, and the process of its decline hastened.

In 1225 CE Sundara Pandyan defeated and drove away a company of Odda (Oriya) soldiers who had invaded the Chola heartland and occupied Srirangam. He allied himself with the Kadava chieftain Kopperunchinga I against the Cholas and Hoysalas. After the defeat and capture of Rajaraja Chola III at Tellaru in 1231 CE by Kopperunchinga, Vira Narasimha II intervened decisively against the Kadava-Pandiyan alliance by sending an army under his generals Appanna and Goppayya. Kopperunchinga was defeated and Raja Raja Chola III was restored to Chola throne in 1231 CE. While his generals were moving against Kopperrunchinga, Narasimha himself defeated Sundara Pandiyan at Mahendramangalam on the banks of Kaveri in 1231 CE. Sundara Pandyan had to acquiesce in the restoration of Raja Raja. After Mahendramangalam, peace was made between the warring Chola, Hoysala, Kadava and Pandyan kingdoms and sealed by dynastic marriages.

== Legacy and titles ==
Under Sundara Pandyan, the Pandyan revival began and the second Pandyan empire rose. Before him, the Pandyas were the vassals of the Cholas and he laid the strong foundations for Pandyan dominance in the later parts of the 13th century. According to the Thiruvandipuram inscriptions he awarded himself the titles of Kaliyugaraman and Adisayapandiyadevan. The coins issued by him also bear the title of Sonadugondan (Conqueror of Chola Country). He celebrated his victory over Cholas by adding the title Tamil: சோணாடு கொண்டு முடி கொண்ட சோழபுரத்து வீராபிஷேகம் பண்ணியருளிய to his meikeerthi. His meikeerthi begins with the words Tamil: பூமலர் வளர்திகழ் and ends with Tamil: சோணாடுவழங்கியருளிய ஸ்ரீசுந்தரபாண்டிய தேவர்க்கு யாண்டு.

== In popular culture ==
Sundara Pandiyan is the protagonist of Akilan's historical novel Kayalvizhi (serialized:1964-65). In the novel's 1978 film adaptation, Pandiyan was portrayed by M. G. Ramachandran.

== Notes ==
Preceded by Jatavarman Kulasekaran I	Pandya; 1216 –1238	Succeeded by Jatavarman Kulasekaran II
