= Maravarman Sundara Pandyan II =

Pandyan emperor from 1238 to 1251

Pandyan Emperor
- Reign: July/August 1238 – 1251
- Coronation: July/August 1238 (Note: He was crowned between 13 July and 12 August)
- Predecessor: Maravarman Sundara Pandyan
- Successor: Jatavarman Sundara Pandyan I
- Co-emperors: Jatavarman Kulasekaran II (1238–1240); Sadayavarman Vikkiraman I (1241–1250)
- Died: 1251 (Note: Last known date is 18 January 1251)
- Religion: Hinduism

Maravarman Sundara Pandyan II (Tamil: இரண்டாம் மாறவர்மன் சுந்தர பாண்டியன்) was a Pandyan king, who ruled regions of South India between 1238–1251.

== Shared rule ==
Sundara Pandiyan II was one of two Pandyan princes who acceded to power in 1238 after Maravarman Sundara Pandyan I. He shared his rule with his elder brother Jatavarman Kulasekaran II for two years. This practice of shared rule with one prince asserting primacy was common in the Pandyan Kingdom. His years of reign are unclear. While Indian historian K. A. Nilakanta Sastri mentions him as the Pandyan prince defeated by Rajendra Chola III around 1250, N. Sethuraman mentions another Pandyan prince - Jatavarman Vikkiraman I as the Pandyan ruler between 1241 and 1250.

== Hoysala influence ==
This period was marked with increasing Hoysala influence over the Chola kingdom under the rule of Vira Someshwara. According to Sastri:

Hoysala influence over the whole area of the Chola kingdom and even in the Pandya country increased steadily from about 1220 to 1245, a period which may be well described as that of Hoysala hegemony in the south.

The Pandyan inscriptions of this period indicate tribute being paid to the Hoysala king. The kilacheval temple grants, Vira Somi Chathurvedimangalam land grants and the presence of a Hoysala general Appana Dandanayaka for settling disputes at Thirumayam all indicate Hoysala dominance over the Chola Country.

== War with Cholas ==
Sundara Pandiyan II was attacked and defeated by the Rajendra Chola III around 1250. To prevent the complete revival of Chola power, Vira Someshwara temporarily allied himself with the Pandyas

== Notes ==
Preceded by Jatavarman Kulasekaran II	Pandya; 1238 –1240	Succeeded by Jatavarman Vikkiraman I
