= Sadayavarman Kulasekaran II =

Pandyan co-emperor from 1238 to 1240

Sadayavarman Kulasekaran II (Tamil: இரண்டாம் சடையவர்மன் குலசேகரன்) was a Pandyan king, who ruled regions of South India between 1238–1240.

== Shared rule ==
Kulasekaran was one of two Pandyan princes who acceded to power in 1238 after Maravarman Sundara Pandyan. He shared his rule with his younger brother Maravarman Sundara Pandyan II. This practice of shared rule with one prince asserting primacy was common in the Pandyan Kingdom.

== Hoysala Influence ==
Kulasekaran's rule was marked with increasing Hoysala influence under the rule of Vira Someshwara. According to KA Nilakanta Sastri:

Hoysala influence over the whole area of the Chola kingdom and even in the Pandya country increased steadily from about 1220 to 1245, a period which may be well described as that of Hoysala hegemony in the south.

The Pandyan inscriptions of this period indicate tribute being paid to the Hoysala king

== Distinction from other Kulasekarans ==
There are records of at least three later Pandyan kings bearing the same name Jatavarman Kulasekaran. This king is identified and distinguished using his meikeerthi which starts with the words poothala vanithai (Tamil: பூதல வனிதை).

== Notes ==
Preceded by Maravarman Sundara Pandyan I	Pandya; 1238 –1240	Succeeded by Maravarman Sundara Pandyan II
