= Veera Ramanatha =

Ramanatha
- King of the Hoysala Empire
- Reign: 1263–1297 CE
- Coronation: 1254 CE
- Predecessor: Vira Someshwara
- Successor: Narasimha III (in Karnataka territories)
- Dynasty: Hoysala dynasty
- Father: Vira Someshwara
- Mother: Queen Devaladevi
- Religion: Jainism

Vira Ramanatha (Kannada: ವೀರ ರಾಮನಾಥ) (1263–1297 CE) was a king of the southern portion of the Hoysala Empire. In 1254 CE, Hoysala king Vira Someshwara divided his kingdom between his two sons, Narasimha III (reign c. 1263–1292 CE) who ruled from Halebidu (Dorasamudra or Dwarasamudra), their original capital, had got the greater part of the ancestral kingdom and Vira Ramanatha Deva (reign c. 1254/1263–1295 CE) obtained the remaining part consisting of the present Kolar district and the Tamil territories conquered by the Hoysalas in the south, and ruled from Kannanur Kuppam near Srirangam. Like his father Narasimha II, Someshwara stayed back at Kannanur with Ramanatha where he was killed in 1262/1263 CE in a war with Sadayavarman Sundara Pandyan I of the Pandya dynasty.

== Early life and division of the Hoysala kingdom ==
Ramanatha and his half-brother, Narasimha III, were devout Jains. During his rule, there were frequent clashes and feud between him and the king. Ramanatha also got the Manne-Nadu (Manne or Manyapura, erstwhile Ganga capital in 8th century CE near Dobbaspet) Kolar, Bangalore and eastern part of Tumkur districts under his share. Historian B. L. Rice mentions that along with the Tamil districts, while defining the western and southern limits of Ramanatha's territory in the Karnataka region, his Kannada regions extended westward up to Devarayanadurga hills, and an imaginary line connecting Urudigere to Hebbur, and from there east to Lakkur in Malur taluk (Kolar district).

Despite this division of the kingdom, inscriptions of both the brothers were found spread over as far south as Tanjore. There were frequent collisions between them revealing that they were not satisfied with the partition. In most of these conflicts Ramanatha was the aggressor, conveying that he was dissatisfied with the partition. His inscriptions from his 2nd to 41st years of reign are scattered throughout his kingdom and many have been found in the Kolar district. Ramanatha had a residence at Kundani, identified by some with Kundana near Devanahalli in Bangalore district and by others with Kundana near Hosur in the Dharmapuri district.

== Territorial control and administration ==
Ramanatha's Mahapradhana (chief minister) was Virayya Dandanayaka, and Pakkadikara Somaya Dandanayaka was one of his ministers. In the Kolar area, llavanjirayar and Manjiyarmavuttar (called the king's son) were his ministers. There are a dozen inscriptions of Ramanatha-Deva dating from 1257–1294 CE, all in Tamil, and are confined to the north and east of Bangalore district. Inscriptions of 1292, 1294 and 1295 CE show Ramanatha's forces intruding into Ballala III's portion of the Hoysala kingdom. Towards the close of his reign, Ramanatha made few unsuccessful attempts to extend his territory over his brother's portion of the kingdom towards the end of his reign and failed. His rule was succeeded by the short rule of his son Vira Vishwanatha Deva (reign c. 1293/1295–1298/1300 CE). Two more inscriptions of 1297 CE belong to the 4th regnal year of Vishwanatha-Deva and his single inscription has been found in the Kolar district. Then this branch of the Hoysalas got merged with the main branch. He was soon ousted, or, his portions of the kingdom were annexed, by Vira Ballala III (reign c. 1292–1343 CE), who thus became the sole ruler of the entire Hoysala kingdom around about 1298–1300 CE. As per some other records, Viswanatha died in 1300 CE making the empire unification task easier for Ballala III.

Ballala III in 1301 CE issued orders in Tamil to the heads of mathas and temple priests in Ramanatha's former portion of the kingdom, remitting all taxes, and confirming the villages granted to them as endowments. The districts named are—the 'Hesar-Kundani' kingdom and several other nads. Of these, Hesar appears in the name Hesaraghatta, north-east of Nelamangala; Kundani is west of Devanahalli, and Ramanatha seemed to have a residence there.

Ballala III was crowned in January 1292 CE when Ramanatha was still alive. We have Ballala's inscriptions throughout the nads or tracts which had formed part of the kingdom of Ramanatha and his son Vishwanatha He had issued notifications remitting taxes on temple endowments and made fresh grants to the temples for securing the goodwill and support of the priesthood. This was called the Kundani kingdom (from Kundani, the royal residence of Ramanatha) and is called Hesar-Kundani kingdom in one of his inscriptions.

== Religious affiliation ==
Ramanatha was a devout follower of Jainism. In 1276 CE, he constructed the Chenn-Parshva-Ramanatha Basadi at Kogali (modern Karnataka).

Inscriptions record that he personally donated gold to Jain temples. He also honored the Jain "ācārya Ubhavacharya" and granted endowments to Jain shrines, including one at Kolhapur.

== Relations with the Pandyas and Cholas ==
Maravarman Kulasekara Pandyan I fought both Vira Someshwara’s son Ramanatha and the last Chola ruler Rajendra Chola III in a battle in 1279 CE, defeated and vanquished Rajendra and ended the Chola dynasty. But Ramanatha continued to hold most of his Tamil and all the Kannada possessions till his end in 1295 CE. This can be evidenced by his inscriptions in Domlur (Tumbalur) in Bengaluru dated 1290 CE in both Tamil and Kannada. The Epigraphia Karnataka (Carnatica) of Bangalore district mentions that the Tamil inscriptions of Chakravarthi Posala Veera Ramanatha Deva were addressed to the authorities of all the temples in his kingdom.

An inscription conveys that Poysala Vira Ramanada donated 10 pens (pons) for the Chokkanathaswamy temple from the Tommalur (Tombalur or Domlur) revenue account in 1290 CE. From the inscriptions in Kannada, on the stonewall skirting the door entrance, as also an inscription on the right which has the seal of a cow and its calf. Inscriptions on the southern wall of Chokkanathaswamy Temple (Sokkaperumal) of village Tombalur (as Domlur was once called) in Desimanikka Pattanam dating back to the Hoysala period mention the consecration of the processional deity in 1266 CE during Ramanatha's rule, donations of door frames and dry and wet lands, remission from taxes and the engagement of an assembly of carpenters and artisans. The script of some of the epigraphs in the temple and on its walls are in Kannada but the language is Tamil, which prove that the temple was of Chola origin. An inscription on the door posts dated 1270 CE, says it has been donated by Alagiyar belonging to Vira Ramanatha's period.

Historian Sakkottai Krishnaswami Aiyangar states that the territory of Maravarman Kulasekhara Pandyan I (1268–1311 CE) during the time of Hoysala Vira Ramanatha's reign, consisted of:

"the region extending south from the mouth of the northern Pennar river to Cape Comorin and farther west, which included the great bulk of the Chola kingdom. It included the district of Salem and part of Coimbatore extending south along the Western Ghats to the Cape. The northern frontier was uncertain. The conquests they made up to Nellore were not made permanently at all so that the boundary between the Pandyas and the Hoysalas might roughly be demarcated along an imaginary line drawn from Trichinopoly (Tiruchirappalli) to Tiruvannamalai and Villupuram along the road from Madura to Madras."

On the other side, the territory of the Hoysalas, under their greatest rulers Vira Someshwara, reached northwards as far as the Krishna river, perhaps even a little beyond. The existence of a record of Someshwara in Pandharpur may be held to indicate that his actual rule extended so far north.

Since 1254-5 CE, Someshwara and his son Vira Ramanatha, who succeeded him in the southern division of the empire, had concentrated more on their Tamil territories. Vira Ramanatha died about 1293 CE, and a son by name Vira Vishwanatha ruled only for three to four years (reign c. 1293-1297 CE). Vira Ballala III maintained three capitals at the three strategic points of the empire, namely, Halebid in the north or north-west, Kundani in the middle keeping communication with the country below (lowland plains), and Kannanur in the south, with Tiruvannamalai as an alternative.

Historian Sakkottai Krishnaswami Aiyangar further states that:

"the whole country south of the line drawn from Goa, or a little north, to the mouth of the northern Pennar river, somewhere to the east of Nellore (which also formed the southern frontier of the Devagiri Sevuna Yadava and Warangal Kakatiya kingdoms and also constituted the northern frontier of the Hoysalas during the reign of the brothers Ramanatha and Narasimha III and that of their successor Vira Ballala III), was divided along a diagonal line say from Chidambaram or Cuddalore, along the main road to Tiruvannamalai and Kundani getting into the tableland a little way north of Hosur and from there to the river Krishna further north. All north of this line (Chidambaram to Tiruvannamalai to Kundani near Krishnagiri) roughly belonged to the Hoysalas and all south to the Pandyas; the more open country along the coast right up to Nellore on the Madurai-Madras road, was a debatable frontier between these two powers."

The last great ruler of the united Hoysala empire was Vira Ballala III who ruled from 1291-2 CE till his death in 1342/3 CE. He was succeeded by a son Vira Virupaksha Ballala IV (reign c. 1343-1346 CE), who perhaps ruled for three more years.

== Sources ==
- Dr. Suryanath U. Kamat, A Concise history of Karnataka from pre-historic times to the present, Jupiter books, MCC, Bangalore, 2001 (Reprinted 2002) OCLC: 7796041
- K.A. Nilakanta Sastri, History of South India, From Prehistoric times to fall of Vijayanagar, 1955, OUP, New Delhi (Reprinted 2002), ISBN 0-19-560686-8

| Preceded by Vira Someshwara | Hoysala; 1263–1295 | Succeeded by Vira Viswanatha |
