= Vikkiraman =

Vikkiraman is a surname. Notable people with the surname include:

- Sadayavarman Vikkiraman I, Pandyan king
- Maravarman Vikkiraman II, Pandyan king
