= Sadayavarman Kulasekaran I =

Pandyan emperor from 1190 to 1216

Pandyan emperor
- Reign: 1190–1216
- Predecessor: Vikkirama Pandyan
- Successor: Maravarman Sundara Pandyan I
- Died: 1216
- House: Pandya
- Religion: Shaivism

Sadayavarman Kulasekaran I (Tamil: முதலாம் சடையவர்மன் குலசேகரன்) was a Pandyan king from 1190 until his death in 1216.

== Accession and background ==
Kulasekaran acceded to the Pandyan throne after his father Vikkirama Pandyan in 1190. Vikkirama Pandyan had gained the throne of Madurai with the help of Kulothunga Chola III. Kulothunga had defeated the rebellion of Vira Pandyan and his Sri Lankan allies and awarded the throne to Vikkirama Pandyan. Vikkiraman's son Kulasekaran became the ruler in 1190. He was a brother-in-law of the Chera prince Kothai Ravivarman.

== War and defeat ==
Kulasekaran was a vassal of the Chola empire. When Kulothunga was warring with Hoysalas in the north, he refused to pay tribute to the Cholas. This led to a Chola invasion in retribution. In 1205, the Chola armies defeated the Pandyan army and sacked Madurai. The ancient coronation hall of Pandyan kings was destroyed, the remains plowed with ashes and sowed with weeds. Inscriptions found at Kudimiyanmalai and Cheranur give graphic descriptions of the invasion and the sacking of Madurai. Kulasekaran and his younger brothers fled Madurai to the Palai (desert wastes) lands. The invaders looted Madurai and distributed the wealth to the destitute. Kulothunga performed a Virabhishekam (tribute of bravery) and crowned himself as Thiribhuvana veeran (Lord of Three Worlds). Kulasekaran surrendered to Kulothunga with his wife and son. Kulothunga acknowledged the surrender and gave his kingdom back. Madurai remained under Chola dominance until 1216. These excesses of Kulothunga directly led to the later Pandyan reprisal under Kulasekaran's younger brother and successor Maravarman Sundara Pandyan I.

== Distinction from other Kulasekarans ==
There are records of at least three later Pandyan kings bearing the same name Jatavarman Kulasekaran. This king is identified and distinguished using his meikeerthi which starts with the words poovin kizhathi (Tamil: பூவின் கிழத்தி). He is the Kulasekaran who donated the village "Rajaghambeeera Chathurvedi Mangalaam" to 1080 Brahmins in 1214.

== Notes ==
Preceded by Vikkirama Pandyan	Pandya; 1190 –1216	Succeeded by Maravarman Sundara Pandyan I
