= Sadayavarman Vikkiraman I =

Pandyan co-emperor from 1241 to 1250

Sadayavarman Vikkiraman I (Tamil: முதலாம் சடையவர்மன் விக்கிரம பாண்டியன்) was king and Lord Emperor of the Pandya dynasty, ruling regions of Tamilakkam (present day South India between 1250–1268). Jatavarman Sundara Pandyan I is remembered for his patronage of the arts and architecture, paying attention to the refurbishment and decoration of Kovils in the Tamil continent. He oversaw the massive economic growth of the Pandyan kingdom. On the eve of his death in 1268, the second Pandyan empire's power and territorial extent had risen to its zenith.

== Unclear Regnal period ==
His years of reign are unclear. While N Sethuraman mentions him as the Pandyan ruler between 1241 and 1250, KA Nilakanta Sastri mentions Maravarman Sundara Pandyan II as the Pandyan prince defeated by Rajendra Chola III around 1250.

== Hoysala influence ==
This period was marked with increasing Hoysala influence under the rule of Vira Someshwara. According to KA Nilakanta Sastri

Hoysala influence over the whole area of the Chola kingdom and even in the Pandya country increased steadily from about 1220 to 1245, a period which may be well described as that of Hoysala hegemony in the south.

The Pandyan inscriptions of this period indicate tribute being paid to the Hoysala king

== Notes ==
Preceded by Maravarman Sundara Pandyan II	Pandya; 1241 –1250	Succeeded by Maravarman Vikkiraman II
