= Vira Chorny-Meshkova =

Ukrainian-Macedonian writer and translator

Vira Chorny-Meshkova (Ukrainian: Віра Чорний-Мешкова; born April 25, 1963, Vojvodina) is a Ukrainian poet and translator based in Macedonia who has translated Ukrainian works into Macedonian and Macedonian works into Ukrainian. She was co-author of research entitled "І пізнайте істину та істина визволить вас..." ("And know the truth and the truth will set you free ...") on the cultural ties between Macedonia and Ukraine. She translated her book Київські епіграми (Kiev Epigrams) into Ukrainian, and it was the first work to be published in Macedonia in the Ukrainian language. She is an activist for the Ukrainian diaspora in Macedonia.

She is a member of the National Writers' Union of Ukraine.
