= Meikeerthi =

A meikeerthi (Tamil: மெய் கீர்த்தி) is the first section of Tamil inscriptions of grant issued by ancient Tamil kings of South India. Meikeerthis of various stone and metal inscriptions serve as important archaeological sources for determining Tamil History.

== Description ==
Meikeerthi is a Tamil word meaning "true fame". During the rule of Rajaraja Chola I it became common practice to begin inscriptions of grant with a standard praise for the king's achievements and conquests. This practice was adopted by Raja Raja's descendants and the later Pandya kings. The length of a meikeerthi may vary from a few lines to a few paragraphs. Only the start of a particular king's meikeerthi remains constant in all his inscriptions and the content varies depending upon the year of his reign the inscription was issued (as he might have made new conquests or new grants since the previous inscription was made). Meikeerthis do not mention a calendar year. Instead they always mention the year of the king's reign in which the inscription was made.

== Historical sources ==
The inscriptions function as historical sources for differentiating the kings of the same name belonging to a particular dynasty. Almost without exception, the meikeerthi of a particular king begins with a unique phrase and this helps to differentiate kings with similar names or titles. For example, amongst the later Pandyan kings there were at least three who were named Jatavarman Kulasekaran (Tamil: சடையவர்மன் குலசேகரன்). By using the meikeerthi found in their inscriptions, they are identified as follows

| Meikeerthi begins with | King | Years of reign |
|---|---|---|
| Boothala Madandhai (Tamil: பூதல மடந்தை) | Jatavarman Kulasekaran | 1162-1177 CE |
| Poovin Kizhathi (Tamil: பூவின் கிழத்தி) | Jatavarman Kulasekaran I | 1190-1218 CE |
| Boothala Vanidhai (Tamil: பூதல வனிதை) | Jatavarman Kulasekaran II | 1238-1240 CE |

They also mention the names of the king's consorts, his conquests, vanquished enemies, vassals and seats of power. As early Tamil records are not dated in any well known calendar, the regnal year mentioned in meikeerthis are important in dating Tamil history. The year of the reign when taken along with contemporary historical records such as the Mahavamsa and accounts of foreign travelers like Abdulla Wassaf, Amir Khusrow and Ibn Battuta helps to determine the chronology of the Chola and Pandya dynasties. Sometimes the king is not identified by name but by an accomplishment (conquest, battle or grant). For example, the Chola prince Aditya Karikalan's meikeerthi refers to him only as "The king who took Vira Pandiyan's head" (Tamil: ஸ்வஸ்திசர் வீரபாண்டியன் தலை கொண்ட கோப்பரகேசரி) without naming him.

== Noted examples ==
| King | Tamil Text | Transliteration | Translation |
|---|---|---|---|
| Rajaraja Chola I | “ஸ்வஸ்திஸ்ரீ திருமகள் போலப் பெருநிலச் செல்வியும் தனக்கே உரிமை பூண்டமை மனக்கொளக் காந்தளூர்ச் சாலை கலமறுத் தருளி வேங்கை நாடுங் கங்க பாடியும் தடிகை பாடியும் நுளம்ப பாடியும் குடமலை நாடுங் கொல்லமுங் கலிங்கமும் முரட்டொழிற் சிங்கள ரீழமண்டலமும் இரட்ட பாடி யேழரை இலக்கமும் முந்நீர்ப் பழந்தீவு பன்னீ ராயிரமும் திண்டிரல் வென்றித் தண்டாற் கொண்ட தன்னெழில் வளரூழியுள் ளெல்லா யாண்டுந் தொழுதக விளங்கும் யாண்டே செழியரைத் தேசுகொள் கோராச கேசரி வர்மரான உடையார் ஸ்ரீராசராச தேவர்க்கு யாண்டு" | Svastisrī tirumakaḷ pōlap perunilac celviyum taṉakkē urimai pūṇṭamai maṉakkoḷak kāntaḷūrc cālai kalamaṟut taruḷi vēṅkai nāṭuṅ kaṅka pāṭiyum taṭikai pāṭiyum nuḷampa pāṭiyum kuṭamalai nāṭuṅ kollamuṅ kaliṅkamum muraṭṭoḻiṟ ciṅkaḷa rīḻamaṇṭalamum iraṭṭa pāṭi yēḻarai ilakkamum munnīrp paḻantīvu paṉṉī rāyiramum tiṇṭiral veṉṟit taṇṭāṟ koṇṭa taṉṉeḻil vaḷarūḻiyuḷ ḷellā yāṇṭun toḻutaka viḷaṅkum yāṇṭē ceḻiyarait tēcukoḷ kōrāca kēcari varmarāṉa uṭaiyār srīrācarāca tēvarkku yāṇṭu. | Raja Raja - the one who desired wealth and earth; Victor of Kandhalur Saalai naval battle; Conqueror of Vengi, Gangavadi, Malai Nadu, kollam, Kalinga, Rettapadi, Nulamba padi, Thadigai Padi, Eelam, Maldives, Pandyas; Every year of his beautiful life and reign is a significant year. |
| Rajendra Chola I | ஸ்வஸ்திஸ்ரீ பூர்வதேசமும் கெங்கையும் கடாரமும் கொண்டருளிந கோப்பரகேசரி பன்மரான உடையார் ஸ்ரீ ராஜேந்திர சோழ சிவசரணசேகர தேவர் கொடுத்தருளின வரியில்லிட்ட படி கல் வெட்டியது கோப்பரகேசரி பன்மரான உடையார் ஸ்ரீ ராஜேந்திர சோழ தேவர்க்கு ஆண்டு மூன்றாவது | Swasthisiri Poorva thesamum gangaiyum kadaramum kondarulina kopparakesarai panmarana udaiyar sri rajendara chola sivasaranasekara devar kodutharulina variyillatta padi kal vettiyathu kopparakesari panmarana udaiyar sri rajendra chola devarku aandu moonravadhu | On the third Regnal year of Rajendra Chola - the conqueror of the East country, Ganges and Kadaram;this stone inscription was made to record the tax exemption grant given by Rajendra, the one who surrendered to Shiva. |
| Jatavarman Sundara Pandyan I | கொங்குஈழம் கொண்டு கொடுவடுகு கோடுஅழித்து கங்கை இருகரையும் காவிரியும் கைகொண்டு வல்லாளனை வென்று காடவனைத் திறைகொண்டு தில்லை மாநகரில் வீராபிஷேகமும் விஜயாபிஷேகமும் செய்தருளிய கோச்சடை பன்மரான திரிபுவனச் சக்கரவர்த்திகள் ஸ்ரீ வீரபாண்டிய தேவர் | Kongu Eelam kondu koduvadugu kodu azhithu gangai irukaraiyum kaviriyum kaikondu vallalanai venru kadavanai thirai kondu thillai managaril veerabishkamum vijayabishekamum seidharuliya kochadai panmarana thiri buvana chakkaravarthikal sri veera pandiya thevar | Veera Pandyan - the conqueror of Kongu Nadu and Eelam; the conqueror of the Ganges and Kaveri; Vanquisher of Hoysala; Subjugator of Kadava Kopperunchinga I; The one who paid victory tribute and bravery tribute at Chidambaram; The ruler of three worlds. |
