= Narasimha III =

Hoysala king from 1263 to 1292

Hoysala king
- Reign: c. 1263 – c. 1292
- Predecessor: Vira Someshwara
- Successor: Veera Ballala III
- Born: 12 August 1240
- Died: 1292 (aged 51–52)
- Issue: Veera Ballala III
- Dynasty: Hoysala
- Father: Vira Someshwara
- Religion: Jainism

Narasimha III (12 August 1240 – 1292) was the king of the Hoysalas from 1263 until his death in 1292. During his rule over the Hoysala Empire, internal feud between the king and his brother Ramanatha ruling from Kannanur came to the forefront. He also had to face invasions from the Seuna who attacked his regal capital Halebidu. However, Narasimha III was able to inflict defeat on these incursions and safeguard his kingdom. He was succeeded by his notable son Veera Ballala III.

== Biography ==
Narasimha III ruled from 1263 to 1292. During his rule over the Hoysala Empire, internal feud between the king and his brother Ramanatha ruling from Kannanur came to the forefront. He also had to face invasions from the Seuna who attacked his regal capital Halebidu. However, Narasimha III was able to inflict defeat on these incursions and safeguard his kingdom. He was succeeded by his notable son Veera Ballala III.

He worshiped Parshvanatha, the 23rd Jain tirthankara, and his spiritual adviser was Maghanandi Siddhanta (Digambara monk of Balatkara Gana).

=== Defeats Mahadeva of Devagiri ===
By the 1260s, the southern Hoysala kingdom had been divided into two parts, and its northern part was ruled by Narasimha. Around 1266, Mahadeva, the king of Devagiri invaded Narasimha's kingdom, and the existence of Yadava inscriptions in the Hoysala territory (such as the Chitradurga district) indicate Yadava influence there.

The invasion was ultimately unsuccessful, and Mahadeva was forced to retreat. Two Hoysala inscriptions state that Mahadeva underestimated Narasimha's power, and entered the battlefield on his elephant in grandiose style; however, he was defeated and fled away on his horse at night.

== Sources ==
- Sangave, Vilas Adinath (1981), The Sacred Shravanabelagola (A Socio-Religious Study) (1st ed.), Bharatiya Jnanpith
- Sen, Sailendra (2013), A Textbook of Medieval Indian History, Primus Books, ISBN 978-9-38060-734-4
- Dr. Suryanath U. Kamat, A Concise history of Karnataka from pre-historic times to the present, Jupiter books, MCC, Bangalore, 2001 (Reprinted 2002) OCLC: 7796041

Preceded by Vira Someshwara	Hoysala; 1263–1292	Succeeded by Veera Ballala III
