= Vira Someshwara =

Hoysala King from 1234 to 1263

Hoysala King
- Reign: c. 1234 – c. 1263
- Predecessor: Vira Narasimha II
- Successor: Narasimha III
- Dynasty: Hoysala

Vira Someshwara (Kannada: ವೀರ ಸೋಮೇಶ್ವರ; r. 1234–1263) was a king of the Hoysala Empire. The preoccupation of Vira Narasimha II in the affairs of Tamil country resulted in neglect of northern territories and he had to face Seuna incursions south of the Tungabhadra River.

== Influence in Tamil country politics ==
During 1225–1250, the Hoysalas consolidated their domination over the South Deccan by asserting complete influence on the Cholas and the Pandyas. Someshwara was actually given the honorific Mamadi ("uncle") by the kings of Tamil country. Magadai Mandalam was conquered by Veera Somesvara in 1236. He allied himself with Chola Rajendra III but made friendship with the Pandyas when the Chola king tried to invade Pandya territory in 1238. Later having defeated Rajendra Chola III, Vira Someshwara again fought for the cause of the Cholas against the Pandyas.

After 1235 CE, Someswara founded his capital in southern city of Kannanur, 5 miles to the north of Srirangam, and called it Vikramapura. In 1236-37 CE, he set up several minor shrines in the Jambukeswaram temple on the Srirangam island, called Vallaliswara, Padumaliswara, Vira Narasingeswara, and Somaleswara named based on his close family members. The Bhojeswara Posaliswara temple was raised by him in Kannanur and he signed his inscriptions in Kannada as Malaparoluganda (Lord among the Malepas, i.e., the hill tribes on the Western Ghats), the Hoysala family title since their beginning in bold Kannada characters.

In 1254 Someshwara divided his kingdom between his two sons, Ramanatha who ruled from Kannanur and Narasimha III who ruled from Halebidu, their original capital. Like his father Narasimha II, Someshwara stayed back at Kannanur with Ramanatha where he was killed in a war with Sadayavarman Sundara Pandyan I of the Pandyan Dynasty.

== Sources ==
- Dr. Suryanath U. Kamat, A concise history of Karnataka from pre-historic times to the present, Jupiter Books, MCC, Bangalore, 2001 (Reprinted 2002) OCLC: 7796041
- K.A. Nilakanta Sastri, History of South India, From Prehistoric Times to Fall of Vijayanagar, 1955, OUP, New Delhi (Reprinted 2002), ISBN 0-19-560686-8

Preceded by Vira Narasimha II	Hoysala; 1235–1263	Succeeded by Narasimha III
