= Vira Narasimha II =

Hoysala King from 1220 to 1234

King of Kuntala
- Reign: 16 April 1220 – 1234
- Predecessor: Veera Ballala II
- Successor: Vira Someshwara
- Dynasty: Hoysala

Vira Narasimha II (Note: Kannada: ಇಮ್ಮಡಿ ವೀರ ನರಸಿಂಹ) was the Hoysala king of Kuntala from 1220 until 1234, with his kingdom located in what is now Karnataka in India. During his reign the Hoysalas gained much influence in the affairs of the Tamil country. He defeated the Kadavas and Pandyas and levied a tribute. He acted as a support to Chola king Rajaraja Chola III, who was possibly his son-in-law, against Pandya incursions. During his rule, Vira Narasimha made Kannanur Kuppam near Srirangam his second capital, with an intent to maintain close watch and control over affairs in Tamil country. Later he fought for the Chola cause again and marched all the way to Rameswaram. The Kannada poet Sumanobana was the court poet of King Vira Narasimha II.

== Campaigns ==
Like his father, Veera Ballala II, Vira Narasimha II was an active ruler with a victorious military career.

=== Defeats Sundara Pandya of the Pandyas ===
During the rule of Vira Narasimha II, a Hoysala army was stationed at Kanchi possibly to avert any incursion from the Telugu Chodas of Nellore, the Kakatiya dynasty of Warangal and the Pandyas of Madurai. The Chola monarch Rajaraja III defied the Pandyas by not paying their annual tribute. Sundara Pandya went on the offensive and routed the Cholas in the battle of Tellaru. Vira Narasimha II rushed to the aid of the Cholas, defeated the South Arcot chiefs and captured Srirangam.

Magadai Mandalam was invaded again in 1220–1238. The Hoysala commanders Appanna and Samudra-Gopayya then reached Chidambaram, routing on their way the Kadava chiefs who were Pandya's allies, in the battle of Perumbalur. Finally, receiving news that the Kadava chiefs were willing to release the Chola monarch Rajaraja III from Sendamangalam where he was held captive and consider the Cholas a free kingdom, the Hoysalas escorted the Chola monarch back to Kanchi in 1231. At the same time, Vira Narasimha II himself had defeated Sundara Pandya in the battle of Mahendramangalam. At Srirangam, Narasimha II built a mantapa (mandapam) in the temple during his halt there en route the march against the Pandya. The Koyilolugu recording the history of the Srirangam temple mentions the Kannada king Vira Narasimharaya II to have built the mantapa in the temple and set up a pillar of victory at Setu (Rameswaram).

=== Defeats Kopperunchinga I of the Kadavas ===
After his war with the Yadavas, Kopperunchinga, the Ambitious Kadava chief fought the Hoysalas in 1224, but suffered a defeat at the hands of Narasimha. On re-establishing the supremacy previously exercised by the Cholas, the Hoysala king assumed the titles Establisher of the Chola country and Destroyer of the demon Kadavaraya.

== Notes ==
Preceded by Veera Ballala II	Hoysala; 1220–1235	Succeeded by Vira Someshwara
