= Ganapati (Kakatiya dynasty) =

Kakatiya emperor from 1199 to 1262

- Sakala-desha-pratishthapanacharya
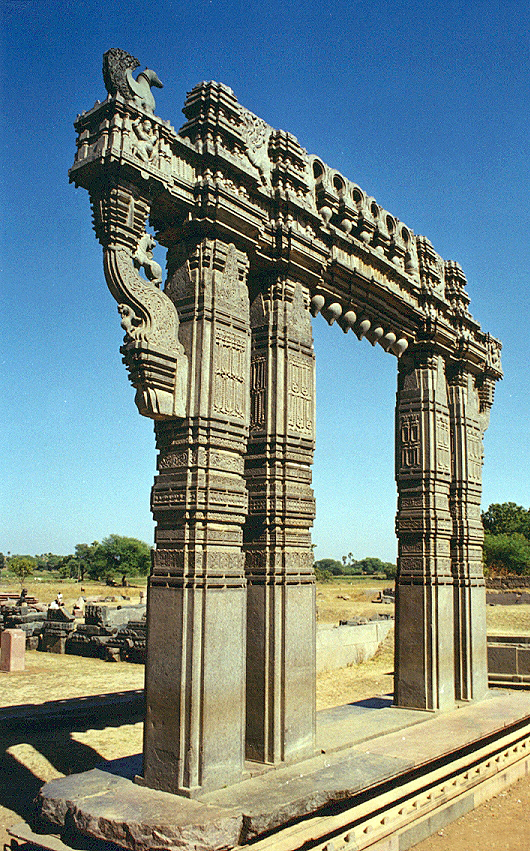

Kakatiya ruler
- Reign: c. 1199–1262
- Predecessor: Mahadeva
- Successor: Rudrama-devi
- Dynasty: Kakatiya
- Father: Maha-deva

Ganapati-deva (r. c. 1199–1262) was the longest reigning monarch of the Kakatiya dynasty of southern India. He brought most of the Telugu-speaking region in present-day Andhra Pradesh and Telangana under the Kakatiya influence by war or diplomacy.

Ganapati's father Mahadeva was killed in a conflict against the Seuna (Yadava) kingdom in 1198–1199, and Ganapati remained in Yadava captivity for some time. The Kakatiya commander Recherla Rudra administered the kingdom in Ganapati's name during this period, protecting it against invaders and rebels.

After his release in 1199, Ganapati consolidated his rule over the kingdom, and conquered the Coastal Andhra region in a series of campaigns. He also fought with the Eastern Gangas for the control of the southern Kalinga and Vengi regions: these campaigns had mixed results, with Kakatiya control limited to the south of the Godavari River. Ganapati supported the Nellore Choda chiefs Tikka and his son Manuma-siddhi II against rival claimants to the throne of Nellore. Towards the end of his reign, he suffered setbacks against the Pandyas, and retired after appointing his daughter Rudrama as his successor.

== Early life ==
Ganapati was a son of his predecessor Mahadeva, who died during an invasion of the Seuna (Yadava) kingdom. The Yadavas captured Ganapati, and during his captivity, the Kakatiya kingdom suffered from revolts and invasions.

During Ganapati's captivity, Rudra of Recherla Reddi family – the commander-in-chief of the Kakatiya army – appears to have handled the administration in Ganapati's name, as suggested by his titles Kakatiya-rajya-bhara-dhaureya and Kakati-rajya-samartha. Epigraphic evidence suggests that Rudra suppressed rebellions by feudatories, and repulsed invasion by an obscure king named Nagati. According to some scholars, such as M. Somasekhara Sarma, Rudra also repulsed an invasion by the Chola king Kulottunga III. Others, such as P.V.P. Sastry dispute this in absence of concrete evidence.

=== Release from Yadava captivity ===
The 26 December 1199 Manthena inscription describes the Ganapati-deva as "the establisher of all the kingdom" (sakala-desha-pratishthapanacharya), which suggests that he had been released from the Yadava captivity by this time and had consolidated his control over his ancestral kingdom. It is not clear why the Yadavas released him. The Yadava inscriptions claim that king Jaitrapala released him out of compassion. It is possible that the Yadavas wanted to secure their eastern border by mainitaning good relations with the Kakatiyas, since they were involved in a conflict with the Hoysalas at their southern border.

The later text Pratapa-charita states that Ganapati was offered in marriage to the daughter of the Yadava king. Historian P.V.P. Sastry doubts this, because according to the contemporary Bayyaram tank inscription, Mahadeva had arranged the marriage of his children Ganapati and Mailamba, and this event must have happened before the military campaign that resulted in Mahadeva's death. According to Chintaluru copper plates Ganapatideva married Seuna princess Somaladevi, a daughter of Jaitugi.

== Reign ==
After being released from the Yadava captivity, Ganapati consolidated his rule with support of loyal commanders, such as the Recherla Reddi chief Rudra and the Malyala chief Chaunda. The political chaos that followed the decline of the Kalyani Chalukya and the Chola empires worked in his favour.

=== Coastal Andhra campaign ===
The inscriptions of Ganapati's uncle Rudra-deva have been found at Draksharamam and Tripurantakam in the coastal Andhra region, but the Kakatiyas had lost control of this region by the time of Ganapati's ascension. In the early years of Ganapati's reign, the Kakatiya army invaded coastal Andhra.

The Velanati Chodas controlled the Vela-nadu area in the coastal Andhra region, although their power had declined considerably after the death of Choda II around 1181. Prithvishvara, the grandson of Choda II, moved his capital from Chandavolu to Pithapuram, and started re-asserting the Velanti Choda power in the Krishna delta region. The Kakatiyas conquered this region by 1201, as attested by the 1201 CE Kanaka-durga temple inscription issued by Ganapati's brother-in-law, the Natavadi chief Vakkadi-malla Rudra.

The Kota chiefs of Dharanikota re-affirmed their acceptance of the Kakatiya suzerainty.

The Kakatiya army led by the Malayala chief Chaunda marched to the Divi island in the Krishna River delta. Pinni Chodi (or Pina Chodi), a chief of the Ayya family, controlled this island, probably as a subordinates of Prithvishvara. The 1203 CE Kondaparti inscription and another 1241 CE inscription, issued by Chaunda and his son Kata respectively, provide some information about this campaign. According to these inscriptions, the father-son duo enriched Ganapati's treasury with diamonds plundered from the island. Ganapati conferred the title Dvipi-luntaka ("plunderer of the island") on Chaunda, and Dvipi-churakara on Kata. The Ayya chiefs accepted Ganapati's suzerainty, and Ganapati allowed them to retain control of the island. Naramba and Peramba, the two daughters of Pinni Chodi married Ganapati. Their brother Jayapa (or Jaya) entered Ganapati's service as a commander (senapati or senani), as attested by his 1231 CE Ganapeshvaram inscription.

Epigraphic evidence suggests that Prithvishvara's authority was limited to a small part of Kalinga, as suggested by his inscriptions from Draksharamam and Srikurmam. He probably fought against the Kakatiya subordinates in an attempt to re-establish his control over the Vela-nadu region, and died during this campaign. This event probably happened sometime in 1206 CE, the date of the Srikurmam inscription of his chief treasurer Ananta, which is the last surviving inscription from his reign. Some inscriptions describe Ganapati as Prithvishvara-shirah-kanduka-krida-vinoda ("the player of the ball that was the head of Prithvishvara"). Multiple chiefs, who were probably Kakatiya subordinates or allies, also claimed this title. These include the Nellore Choda chief Tikka-bhupala, the Seuna Yadava chief Vishvanatha, and the Maha-mandaleshvara Ballaya of Chola family (probably of Kamma-nadu). All these chiefs probably participated in the battle that resulted in the death of Prithvishvara.

By 1209, Ganapati had annexed the Vela-nadu and the Karmma-rashtra (Kamma-nadu) regions to his kingdom, as attested by the 1209 CE Chenna-keshava temple (Idupulapadu near Bapatla) inscription. Ganapati appointed Jayapa as the governor of the Vela-nadu region, as attested by his 1213 CE Chebrolu inscription. The appointment possibly happened earlier, but this is not certain, as Jayapa's Chandavolu inscription is partially built in a wall, rendering its date unreadable.

The chiefs of Kamma-nadu region, most probably the Telugu Chodas of Koni-dena appear to have asserted independence. Ganapati's loyal subordinate – Opili Siddhi – a member of the Potapi branch of the Telugu Chodas, subjugated the rebels. Ganapati made him the governor of the former rebel territory as a reward. Epigraphic evidence suggests that the Chakra-narayana chiefs of Addanki accepted Ganapati's suzerainty around the same time, before 1217–1218.

=== First southern campaign ===
The 1213 CE Chebrolu inscription of Jayapa refers to Ganapati's military campaign against the southern kings. It states that upon his return from this campaign, Ganapati conferred the lordship of the southern region to Jayapa.

These southern kings were most probably the Nellore Choda chiefs, who were Chola vassals. Earlier, around 1180 CE, the Chola king Kulottunga III had defeated the Choda ruler Manuma-siddhi I (alias Vira-Ganda-Gopala) and installed the latter's brother Nalla-siddhi on the throne. Nalla-siddhi and his younger brother Tammu-siddhi ruled as Chola vassals till 1207–1208. Manuma-siddhi I's son Tikka (or Takka), who had earlier helped Ganapati against Prithvishvara, sought Ganapati's help to claim the throne of Nellore. Ganapati marched to Nellore, forced Tammu-siddhi to flee, and installed Tikka on the throne as Tikka-bhupala. Tikka later also appeased Kulottunga III by acknowledging his suzerainty.

Ganapati's 1228 CE Mattevada inscription states that he plundered the Chola capital (probably Kanchi, which was an alternate capital of the Nellore chief). The 1231 CE Ganapeshvaram inscription of Jayapa states that he subdued several countries including Chola, Kalinga, Seuna, Brihat-Karnata, and Lata; he also annexed Vela-nadu and Dvipa (Divi). It appears that Tikka faced invasion from rulers or chiefs belonging to these countries, and Ganapati helped Tikka repulse their invasion.

Tikka appointed Gangaya-sahini, who eventually entered Ganapati's service, as the governor of Upper Paka-nadu region within his kingdom. Tikka later repulsed Hoysala invasions: since Tikka was a minor chief, historian M. Somasekhara Sarma speculates that Ganapati assisted him in this conflict; however, there is no direct evidence of this.

=== Kalinga and Vengi ===
After the death of Prithvishvara, Ganapati sent his armies, led by Soma and Raja-nayaka, to the Kalinga region to consolidate his control over Prithvishvara's former territories. Soma (or Somaya), who held the position of pradhani or mantri (minister) belonged to the Induluri family. Raja-nayaka was a subordinate to Rudra of the Recherla Reddi family.

Raja-nayaka appears to have achieved successes in the area to the north-east of the core Kakatiya territory, sometime before 1212 CE. His 1236 CE Upparapalli inscription credits him with the following victories:

- Subjugated the rulers of the Manniyas (whose territory was located around the borders of present-day Telangana, Chhattisgarh, and Odisha)
- Achieved a victory at Bokkera (near Aska), where he killed a famous warrior chief titled Godhumarati: this chief may be same as Vairi-Godhu-magharatta, who was killed by Japa senapati according to the latter's Ganapeshvaram inscription
- Captured Udayagiri (in former Pedda Khimedi region) and forced Padiya-raya (or Padi-raya) to flee

After his successes in Kalinga, Raja-nayaka marched to Draksharamam, and made a gift for maintaining the perpetual lamps to the god Bhimeshvara in 1212 CE. The rulers subjugated by Raja-nayaka were probably subordinates of the Eastern Ganga king Rajaraja III. The Kakatiya control over their territories did not last long, and they soon declared independence or accepted the Ganga suzerainty.

==== Conflict with the Eastern Gangas ====
Ganapati conducted his military campaigns in the Kalinga and the Vengi regions over several years. His Ganapeshvaram, Upparapalli, and Moupalli inscriptions suggest that he made several attempts to subjugate Kalinga and Vengi from 1212 CE onwards.

Sometime before 1217 CE, Ananga Bhima III, the successor of the Eastern Ganga king Rajaraja III, expelled Kakatiya forces from Kalinga. Ananga Bhima III established his control over the Trikalinga or Trayi-vasundhara region, as attested by his 1217–1218 Bhimeshvara temple inscription. By 1230 CE, the Eastern Ganga forces had arrived at Draksharamam, where their commander Jesrajaka commissioned repairs to the Bhimeshvara temple.

Ananga Bhima III also invaded Vengi, where petty chiefs, such as the Chalukyas of Pithapuram and the Manniyas accepted his suzerainty. Ganapati sent an army led by Soma to the Godavari delta region. Soma (or Somaya) held the position of pradhani or mantri (minister), and belonged to the Induluri family. Shiva-yoga-sara, a 15th-century text written by a descendant of Soma, states that Soma:

- Captured Gogula-nadu and Kolani-vidu (Kolanu, also called Sarasi-puri or Kamala-kara-puri)
- Crossed the Godavari River, and captured the two Madiyas and the twelve Manniyas
- Occupied the land of Kalinga-sima (the Kalinga border)

Kolanu or Sarasi-puri, likely present-day Saripalle in West Godavari district, was under the control of Maha-mandaleshvara Kolani Keshava-deva during 1192–1128 CE. Epigraphic evidence attests to Eastern Ganga presence in this region: Keshava-deva may have received military assistance from Ananga Bhima III or may have accepted his suzerainty. The Kakatiya general Soma probably conquered this region after the death of Keshava-deva and the retreat of the Ganga forces: Ganapati made him the governor of the conquered territory, and he came to be known as Kolani Soma. A 1231 CE Paleshvara temple (Iragavaram) inscription confirms the Kakatiya conquest of Kolanu in Vengi region in that year.

Historian M. Somasekhara Sarma speculates that Bhima – the Telugu Choda chief of Eruva, also participated in Ganapati's campaign. The later 1322–1333 CE Talla-Prodduturu inscription credits Bhima with victories in several places in and around Kalinga, and it is likely that a minor chief like him achieved these victories as a subordinate or an ally or a stronger ruler. According to historian P.V.P. Sastry, Bhima achieved these victories before Ganapati's time, as a Kalyani Chalukya subordinate.

The Kakatiyas seem to have regained control of Draksharamam, as attested by a 1237 CE inscription of the Kakatiya general Mallala Hemadri Reddi at the local temple. Hemadri Reddi forced the Velanati chief Gonka to flee. However, there is no evidence that the Kakatiyas controlled any part of Kalinga beyond Draksharamam.

Ganapati probably tried to secure the political allegiance of the Chalukyas of Nidadavolu by marrying his daughter Rudrama to the Chalukya prince Virabhadra.

Ananga Bhima III's son and successor Narasimha I, who ascended the throne in 1238 CE, invaded the Godavari region. However, the Kakatiyas continued to control this region until the end of the dynasty.

According to the Telugu-language text Vallabhabhyudayam, Narasimha sent an army led by his foster brother Danda-nayaka Ananta-pala to Kanchi. Ananta-pala halted at Srikakolanu, where he erected a temple dedicated to the god Telugu Vallabha (Andhra Vishnu). He then achieved a victory at Kanchi, and extracted tribute from the local ruler. The veracity of this account is uncertain.

The 1257 CE Nandaluru inscription of the Telugu Choda king Manuma-siddhi II refers to the Kalinga expedition of the Kakatiyas, which was probably aimed at repulsing Narasimha's invasion. It states that he allied with Ganapati to fight against the Kalingas on the banks of the Godavari river, and then crossed the River while chasing the Kalinga king. This must have happened some time after Manuma-siddhi's ascension in 1248. The Kakatiya control was likely limited to the south of the Godavari River. Epigraphic evidence suggests that Ganapati's subordinate Padikamu Boppa-deva of Chalukyan family, who held the titles patta-sahini and sakala-senadhipati, killed a prince named Godavari Gonturi Naga-deva. This incident may have happened during the Kakatiya-Kalinga battle on the banks of the Godavari.

=== Second southern expedition ===
In 1248, Ganapati's Nellore Choda vassal Tikka died. His son and successor Manuma-siddhi II faced multiple challenges to his authority:

- Vijaya-Ganda-Gopala, who claimed to be a scion of the Telugu Choda family, captured the northern part of present-day Tamil Nadu (former Chingleput and North Arcot districts). He entered into an alliance with the rulers of the neighbouring Dravida and Karnata kingdoms. The Dravida king was the Chola king, probably Rajaraja III or his co-regent Rajendra III; the Karnata king was Vira Someshvara.
- Bayyana and Tikkana, two Padiharis, rebelled against Manuma-siddhi II, forcing him to flee his capital.
- The Vaidumba chief Tikkaras Ganga alias Rakkasa Ganga defeated Manuma-siddhi II's commander Gangaya-sahini, and captured the Pakanadu region (a part of the Cuddapah district). His ally, the Telugu Chola chief of Jagatapi Gutti (modern Gooty), claimed to have plundered "the entire property of Gandapendera Gangaya Sahini".

After losing control of his kingdom, Manuma-siddhi II sent the poet Tikkana as an emissary to Ganapati's court. Ganapati sent an army led by Samanta Bhoja in Manuma-siddhi II's support.

The undated Nayanipalli (Guntur district) inscription states that the Kakatiya army burnt Nellore, and played a game of ball with the heads of the rebels Bayyana and Tikkana. The inscription also states that the army entered the Dravida-mandala, and captured the capital of Kulottunga Rajendra Choda. The captured city was probably Kanchi, the capital of the Chola king Rajendra III. In 1250 CE, Bhoja's army achieved a decisive victory at Palaiyaru, defeating the combined army of Dravida, Karnataka, and Vijaya-Ganda-Gopala. Manuma-siddhi regained control of Nellore, but Vijaya-Ganda-Gopala continued to rule Kanchi, as attested by his inscriptions there until 1282.

The Kakatiya army then defeated the Vaidumba chief Rakkasa Ganga, and Manuma-siddhi II regained control of Pottapi-nadu, the territory he had earlier lost to Rakkasa Ganga. Although the Kakatiya army played an important role in this victory, Manuma-siddhi II's court poet Tikkana gives the entire credit to his master. Gangaya-sahini, who had earlier lost to Rakkasa Ganga, entered Ganapati's service. Ganapati granted the Marjavadi region captured from Rakkasa Ganga to Gangaya-sahini as a family estate.

According to a 1254 CE inscription of Kalapa Nayaka, the Kakatiya governor of Vengi, he was the saviour of Kulottunga Rajendra Choda. This suggests that Rajendra may have accepted Kakatiya supremacy.

=== Relation with the Yadavas ===
Ganapati generally maintained friendly relations with the Seunas (Yadavas). The Yadava chief Vishvanatha appears to have participated in the Kakatiya campaign against Prithvishvara, as attested by his title Prithvishvara-shirah-kanduka-krida-vinoda. The Yadava prince Permadi-deva, a son of Simhana, was a subordinate of Ganapati, as attested by the 1159 CE Peruru inscription which records his gifts of lands to brahmanas. Some Yadava (or Arya) chiefs also assisted Ganapati in his southern campaign against the Pandyas.

Some Kakatiya inscriptions claim that Ganapati defeated the Yadavas. One inscription states that Ganapati conquered Sevana, identified with the Yadava king Simhana. Another inscription describes Ganapati as a terror to Simhana, and states that he defeated Simhana at a battle near Kurumalur, supported by the Telugu Choda chief. Both Kakatiya and Seuna inscriptions dated 1250 CE have been found at Eleshvaram (near Devarakonda), suggesting that the kingdoms fought indecisive battles over this area.

=== Conflict with the Pandyas ===
Around 1257 CE, the Pandya king Jata-varman Sundara I subjugated the Chola king Rajendra III, Vijaya-Ganda-Gopala of Kanchi, and the Kadava chief Kopperunijinga. With the help of these new vassals, he then attacked the kingdom of the Nellore Choda ruler Manuma-siddhi II of Nellore. Manuma-siddhi II sought help from the Kakatiya, the Seuna (Yadava), and the Bana rulers.

The Pandya allies appear to have invaded the Kakatiya territory, as suggested by Tripurantakam inscriptions of Rajendra III and Kopperunijinga. Apparently in an attempt to form alliance with the king of Kalinga, Kopperunijinga advanced as far as Draksharamam in the north, but Ganapati defeated him. He appears to have acknowledged Ganapati's suzerainty; Ganapati later honoured him with vira-pada-mudra ("presentation of the anklet of the heroes"), possibly to cause a split in the Pandya camp.

The Pandya records suggest that Ganapati suffered setbacks against them towards the end of his reign. While the Kakatiya army was still campaigning against Kopperunchinga, the main Pandyan army – led by Jatavarman Sundara I, Bhuvanaika-vira Vikrama, and Jatavarman Vira – marched towards Nellore. The Pandyas captured Nellore, and killed Manuma-siddhi II in the Battle of Muttukuru in 1263 CE. The brothers of Manuma-siddhi II accepted the Pandya suzerainty, agreeing to rule Nellore as Pandya vassals, although epigraphic evidence suggests that other Pandya vassals controlled the area shortly after.

The Pandya army also achieved successes against his allies: the Kakatiyas, the Seunas, and the Banas. The Pandya records claim that the dead bodies of the Kakatiya and Seuna soldiers lay all over the land, as far as the banks of Peraru, while the Banas fled to the jungle. The Pandya king Jata-varman Sundara celebrated virabhisheka (anointment) of his conquest over Nellore and Kanchi. He also issued coins bearing the Kakatiya emblem of varaha (boar) on the obverse, and the Pandya emblem of fish on the reverse.

== Administration ==
During his reign of 63 years, Ganapati brought under his influence almost the entire Telugu-speaking territory by war or diplomacy. Continuing his predecessor Rudra-deva's project of moving the capital from Anumakonda to Orugallu, he built a new fortification with 75 bastions, each protected by a nayaka (chief). The fortification comprised a stone and a mud fort, one within the other.

Ganapati took several measures to improve trade and agriculture. He subjugated the petty chiefs who had been harassing the foreign merchants at the Motupalli port. He took measures to ensure the safety of the merchants, and granted them special concessions to promote trade.

Ganapati's loyal subordinates included:

- The Recherla chief Rudra helped preserve the Kakatiya authority when Ganapati was under Yadava captivity.
- The Malyala chief Chaunda and his son Kata led the Kakatiya campaigns in the Divi and Vela-nadu regions.
- The Ayya chiefs of Divi entered his service after being subjugated.
- Jayapa or Jaya, the senapati or senani (commander), led the elephant force, as suggested by his title gaja-senani ("elephant commander"). He also composed Nṛtta Ratnāvalī, a treatise on dancing and choreography.
- Samanta Bhoja of Dochi family, who led the southern campaign in support of Manuma-siddhi II in c. 1249 CE.
- Bhaskara-deva, a commander of the elephant force.

Ganapati's subordinate allies and vassals included:

- The Nellore Choda chief Manuma-siddhi II
- Opili Siddhi of Konidena
- Madhava Maharaja, the Chakra-narayana ruler of Addanki, and his son Saranga-dhara-deva
- Vira-bhadra, an Vengi Chalukya, who married Ganapati's daughter Rudrama

Ganapati's ministers included:

- Soma or Somaya of Induluri family, who served as a maha-pradhana, and also served as a general despite being from a Brahmin family
- Prola Bhima-nayaka, another maha-pradhana, bore the titles Aruvela-dushaka ("destroyer of Velanadu") and Kanchi-chura-kara ("plunderer of Kanchi").
- Gangaya-sahini of a Kayastha family. According to the 1254 CE Tripurantakam inscription, he held the position of bahattara-niyogadhipati, the superintendent of 72 niyogas or royal offices including generals and ministers. He was also a commander of the cavalry (turaga-sadhanika). Ganapati conferred upon him a fief extending from Panugal in the north to Kaivaram in the south: he ruled this land from his capital at Valluru-Pattana (near Kadapa). He died in 1257 CE, and was succeeded by his nephew Janniga-deva or Janardana, the son of his younger sister Chandala-devi.
- Prola Rautu, the minister of war (tantra-pala)
- Potana, Kuchena Preggeda, and Kondaya Preggada – all of whom held the office of pradhana

Some Kakatiya inscriptions claim that several other Indian kings were Ganapati's vassals. For example:

- The Chebrolu inscription of Jayapa claims that the following kings were suppliants at his door: Madra, Panchala, Videha, Hammira (possibly a Muslim ruler), Huna, and Kashi.
- The Pakhal inscription claims that his heralds presented the following kings to him at each assembly: Kashi, Kalinga, Shaka, Kerala, Tummana (in Madhya Pradesh), Huna, Kurus, Arimarda (possibly Pegu in Burma), Magadhas, Nepala, and Chola.

Such boastful claims were part of a literary convention popular with prashasti writers, and can be dismissed as historically inaccurate. Except the Kalinga and Chola rulers, the rest of these kingdoms had ceased to exist by Ganapati's kingdom, and much of the northern India was under the Delhi Sultanate. At best, Ganapati may have had some contact, friendly or otherwise, with the rulers of these regions.

== Succession ==
Ganapati apparently retired after suffering defeats against the Pandyas in the late 1250s. He did not have a male heir, and had two daughters: Rudrama-devi (or Rudramba) and Ganapama-devi (or Ganapamba). Rudrama married Virabhadra, a prince of Vengi Chalukya ancestry; and Ganapama married Beta of Kota family.

Ganapati nominated his elder daughter Rudrama as his successor. She began to rule as a co-regent from 1259 to 1260 under the regnal name Rudra-deva Maharaja. The 17th-century text Pratapa-charitra states that Ganapati had two sons from his junior queens; these sons – Hari-hara and Murari-deva – revolted against Rudrama. No other source mentions these purported sons of Ganapati. According to the Tripurantakam inscription of Ganapati's sister Mailama, Hari-hara was actually a paternal uncle of Ganapati.

Ganapati was alive at least until 1269 CE, as suggested by the Duggi (in Palnad) inscription of his subordinate Janniga-deva. This inscription calls Rudrama the "chosen royalty" (pattoddhati, a mistake for pattodhrti), which suggests that officially, she was still a queen-designate and not a queen.

Some members of the royal family appear to have contested Rudrama's ascension. For example, according to Pratapa-charita, Harihara and Murari-deva, who were Ganapati's sons by other queens, revolted against Rudrama and seized the capital. However, the loyal Kakatiya feudatories helped suppress these rebellions.
