= Vakkadimalla Rudra =

Vassal Ruler of Kakatiyas
- In office 1201–1248
- Monarch: Ganapatideva

Personal details
- Parent: Buddha (father)

Military service
- Allegiance: Kakatiya Dynasty
- Battles/wars: Ganapati's Coastal Andhra Campaign; Battle of Bezawada; Siege of Divi; Defeat of Pruthviswara

Vakkadimalla Rudra was a subordinate ruler of Kakatiya king Ganapatideva ruling from the Natavadi region. He maintained close ties with the Kakatiya royal family through his marriage to Melambika the sister of Ganapatideva. Rudra actively supported the Kakatiyas in their military campaigns and accompanied Ganapatideva during the conquest of the Coastal Andhra region. His role in these campaigns helped strengthen Kakatiya control over newly conquered territories.

== Life ==
Vakkadimalla Rudra was a vassal ruler under the Kakatiya dynasty who governed the Natavadi region. He was the son of Buddha. Rudra married Melambika, the daughter of the Kakatiya ruler Mahadeva and the sister of Ganapatideva.

== Military career ==
Vakkadimalla Rudra accompanied Ganapatideva during his campaign in the Coastal Andhra region.

=== Ganapati's Coastal Andhra Campaign ===
==== Battle of Bezawada ====
In 1201 CE, Ganapatideva led a major campaign into Coastal Andhra with a strong army supported by subordinate chiefs such as the Kotas, Natavadis, and Malayalas. He first targeted Bezawada which lay on the eastern frontier of the Kakatiya kingdom. An inscription of the Natavadi chief Vakkadimalla Rudra found at the Kanakadurga Temple on Indrakila hill and dated to 1201 CE, records the presence of Natavadi troops in the city along with Kakatiya forces. This suggests that Bezawada was quickly brought under Kakatiya control during the campaign.

==== Siege of Divi ====
After capturing Bezawada Ganapatideva advanced eastward to the island of Divi near the mouth of the Krishna River. This island served as the headquarters of the Ayya chiefs who controlled the fertile delta region. The Ayya rulers resisted strongly relying on the fortifications of their island stronghold. Despite their efforts they were eventually forced to surrender and the Kakatiya army took control of the island plundering its wealthy capital.

==== Defeat of Pruthviswara ====
Pruthviswara of the Velanati Chodas tried to reconquer the coastal Andhra region from Ganapatideva but he was defeated. The Kakatiya forces were supported by their feudatories including the Malayalas, Natavadis, and Kotas along with their allies the Nellore Chodas under Tikka Choda I and the Konidena Chodas under Balayya Choda. In the battle that followed Pruthviswara was defeated and killed securing Kakatiya control over the Coastal Andhra region.

== Personal life ==
Vakkadimalla Rudra had three wives Melambika, Kundamamba, and Bayyaladevi. He had two children, a son named Mahadeva and a daughter named Mahadevi.

== Cultural Activities ==
Melambika, the wife of Vakkadimalla Rudra is known from an inscription at the Tripurantakesvara Temple. The record dated to the reign of Ganapatideva states that Melambika, the king's sister and the daughter of Mahadeva, built and consecrated a temple called Melambikesvara near the main shrine of Tripurantakam. The inscription engraved on a pillar near the linga on the north side of the temple kitchen (vantamidde) also mentions her grants of land below the tank of the village of Tirtalu and a gift of 25 goats to maintain a perpetual lamp in the temple.

== See also ==
- Velanati Chodas
- Recherla Rudra
- Rudramadevi
