= Rudradeva =

Kakatiya ruler from 1158 to 1195

Rudra-deva
- Maha-mandaleshvara; Pati-hita-charita; Vinaya-Vibhushana

Kakatiya ruler
- Reign: c. 1158 – c. 1195
- Predecessor: Prola II
- Successor: Mahadeva
- Dynasty: Kakatiya
- Father: Prola II

Rudra-deva (r. c. 1158 – c. 1195) was a Kakatiya king, who ruled parts of the present-day Telangana and Andhra Pradesh in southern India. He was the first sovereign ruler of his dynasty.

Like his father Prola II, Rudra was initially a vassal to the Chalukyas of Kalyani. Amid the decline of the Chalukya power, he subjugated several other Chalukya subordinates who had rebelled against the Chalukya authority. These included the Choda chief Bhima II, Domma-raja of Nagunuru, and Meda II of Polavasa. He also appears to have fought against the Kalachuris of Kalyani, who had usurped the power from the Chalukyas.

Rudra proclaimed sovereignty around 1163 CE, and conquered the coastal Andhra region by defeating several local chiefs, amid the decline of the Velanati Choda power. He moved the Kakatiya capital from Anumakomda (present-day Hanamkonda) to Orugallu (present-day Warangal), and started the construction of a fort there. He commissioned the Rudreshvara temple, popularly known as the Thousand Pillar Temple, at Anumakomda.

== Early life ==
Rudradeva was the eldest son of the Kakatiya ruler Prola II, a vassal of the Chalukyas of Kalyani. The earliest extant record from Rudradeva's reign is the 1158 CE Daksharamam inscription issued by his minister Inangala Brammireddi. This inscription describes the death of his father, possibly during an invasion of the Vengi area in the coastal Andhra region.

The Daksharamam inscription dates itself to the Shaka year 1080 (1158 CE) and to the 13th regnal year of the "Chalukya-Chola" king Rajaraja II. It is possible that the inscription mentions Rajaraja II's regnal years, simply because it was customary to do so in the Daksharamam area: the Cholas were traditionally regarded as the overlords of the Vengi kingdom, although their power was not completely effective in this region. According to another theory, Rudra probably entered into an alliance with Rajaraja II, obtained the Godavari delta region as a fief from him, and invaded the region to avenge his father's death. Yet another possibility is that Prola II, accompanied by Inangala Brammireddi, had allied with Rajaraja II in an attempt to suppress a revolt by Kota and Haihaya chiefs; after his death in the resulting battle, his minister mentioned Rudradeva as the Kakatiaya ruler.

== Early military career ==
The Thousand Pillar Temple inscription credits Rudra with several victories that ultimately led to the establishment of Kakatiyas as a sovereign power. Many of these victories were against his father's enemies or their relatives. He appears to have achieved these victories sometime before 1163 CE, when he proclaimed sovereignty.

=== Tailapa and Bhima of Vardhamana ===
During the time of Rudra's father Prola II, Kumara Tailapa, a younger brother the Chalukya king Someshvara III, governed the Kanduru-nadu province, with the Choda chiefs as his subordinates. Prola II helped Someshvara's successor Jagadeka-malla II suppress a rebellion by Tailapa and the Choda chiefs. Because he was a member of the Chalukya royal family, Tailapa was released and probably allowed to retain his royal privileges.

After the death of Prola II, Tailapa probably again tried to assert his independence. According to the Thousand Pillar Temple inscription, Tailapa "died of dysentery caused by the terror of Rudra", and subsequently, the Choda chief Bhima II declared himself the king. It appears that Bhima owed allegiance to Kumara Tailapa, and after his death, declared himself the king of Kanduru-nadu, possibly during the reign of the Chalukya king Tailapa III.

According to the Thousand Pillar Temple inscription, Rudra invaded Bhima's town of Vardhamana (present-day Vaddaman or Vaddemanu). This invasion was likely not ordered by the Chalukya king, but was a result of Rudra's desire to check Bhima's influence in the area.

=== Burning of Chododaya's city ===
According to the Thousand Pillar Temple inscription, Rudra burnt the town of Chododaya ("Udaya the Choda"). Chododaya likely refers to Udaya II, the Choda ruler of Panugallu. Historian M. Somasekhara Sarma theorizes that at the time of Rudra's attack, the town of Chododaya was a part of Bhima's territories. If the town was still under the control of Udaya II, this conflict likely happened after the reign of the Chalukya king Jagadeka-malla II, since both Rudra and Udaya II recognized him as their overlord. Udaya II's 1148-1149 CE Emdabetta (near Nagarkurnool) and Sirikonda inscriptions mention him as a subordinate of Jagadeka-malla. Since both Bhima II and Udaya II belonged to the Choda family, it is possible that Rudra defeated both of them in a single campaign. This campaign may have taken place between 1157 CE and 1162 CE, as Bhima and Udaya are attested by their 1157 CE Kishtapuram and Rachuru inscriptions, and Rudra's victory is mentioned in his 1163 CE Thousand Pillar Temple inscription.

The Thousand Pillar Temple inscription states that Rudra became "the resort of the shining lotus (padma) born of the milky ocean of the dynasty" of Chododaya. This probably refers to his construction of a large tank at the site of the destroyed city. E. Hultzsch suggests that Padma was the name of Udaya's daughter. Probably as part of a peace treaty, Rudra allowed Udaya II to hold his fief, and married his daughter.

Rudra assigned the name "Panugamti-vada" to a locality in Orugallu (present-day Warangal) to commemorate his capture of Panugallu. He granted the upper tract of the Srisailam forest as a fief to the Charaku chiefs, who assisted him in his campaign against the Chodas, as attested by a 1202 CE inscription of the Charaku chief Bollaya.

=== Domma-raja ===
According to the Thousand Pillar Temple inscription, Rudra defeated Domma-raja and captured his town. The inscription states that Rudra forced him to flee "by hundreds of his shining arrows as Arjuna did Karna".

Domma-raja was the chief (maha-mandaleshvara) of Nagunuru, where his inscriptions have been found. Rudra likely defeated him in 1159 CE, the approximate date of his last extant inscription found at Nagunuru. The 1159 CE Nagunuru inscription of Domma-raja states that an 80,000-strong army of he, Medaraja and Jaga-deva defeated an unnamed enemy. It is possible that this enemy was Rudra, who later defeated these chiefs. The inscription records the death of Jaga-deva, who probably died fighting Rudra's army.

=== Meda ===
According to the Thousand Pillar Temple inscription, Rudra subdued the prowess of Meda, defeated the confederacy of the rival kings, and acquired the wealth of Poalvasa-desha (territory). This refers to his subjugation of Meda II, the ruler of Polavasa. Earlier, Rudra's father Prola II had killed Meda's brother Gumda.

According to a fragmentary inscription of Rudra's minister Gangadhara, found at Anumakomda, Meda-raja (Meda II) refused to establish peace by offering his daughter to Rudra. Consequently, he lost his wealth, pride and family reputation.

=== Mailigi and Kalachuris of Kalyani ===
According to the Thousand Pillar Temple inscription, Rudra destroyed the pride that arose during the meeting with Mailigi-deva. This statement occurs in the inscription after the narration of his victory over the neighbouring chiefs Domma-raja and Meda, and before the narration of his acquisition of wealth of Polavasa. Thus, it is likely that Rudra defeated all these chiefs in the same campaign.

The identity of Mailigi-deva is uncertain, but he was most probably a member of the Kalyani Kalachuri dynasty that supplanted the Kalyani Chalukyas. Since Rudra was a former Kalyani Chalukya vassal, the Kalachuris may have tried to make him accept their own suzerainty. The brother and the son of the Kalachuri king Bijjala II were both named Mailigi, and either of these may have led an army against Rudra. Domma-raja and Meda II may have sided with the Kalachuris in this campaign.

E. Hultzsch identified Mailigi with Mallugi, the predecessor of the Yadava king Bhillama V, but this can be dismissed on phonological grounds.

According to the 1161 CE Lakshmeshwara inscription of Bijjala II, he repulsed an invasion by the king of Andhra. Since Rudra was the most prominent king of the Andhra region, it appears that he made an unsuccessful attempt to capture the Kalachuri capital Kalyani, probably as an extension of the campaign against Mailigi and other chiefs. An inscription of Rudra claims that his kingdom extended up to Kataka ("fort") in the west. This may be a reference to his march up to Kalyana-Kataka, another name for Bijjala's capital Kalyani.

== Proclamation of sovereignty ==
Rudra proclaimed sovereignty in 1163 CE. According to one theory, he allied with the Kalachuri king Bijjala II, who overthrew his overlords - the Chalukyas of Kalyani. However, this is unlikely as epigraphic evidence suggests that he fought against Mailigi of the Kalachuri family. Moreover, in his inscriptions as a sovereign, he continues to bear the feudatory title Maha-mandaleshvara, although he does not mention an overlord. His other sovereign titles were also modest, for example, Pati-hita-charita and Vinaya-Vibhushana ("he whose adornment is modesty", in 1186 CE Daksharamam inscription). This suggests that he remained loyal to the Chalukyas till the end of that dynasty, and stopped mentioning an overlord only when no claimant to the Chalukya throne remained.

According to Rudra's inscription, at this time, his kingdom extended from Godavari River in the north to Srisailam area in the south, and from Kataka (Kalyana-Kataka or Kalyani) in the west to the ocean (Bay of Bengal) in the east. The claim about the western boundary probably refers to his march up to Kalyani in the west during his campaign against the Kalachuri general Mailigi. The claim about the eastern boundary is supported by the 1158 CE Daksharamam inscription of Rudra's minister Inangala Brammireddi. However, it is an exaggeration, as much of the coastal Andhra region was under the control of Velanati Chodas and other chiefs, and Rudra's control over Daksharamam was temporary (see Conquest of coastal Andhra below).

== As a sovereign ==
=== Victrory over Chakrakuta ===
A fragmentary inscription of Rudra's minister Gangadhara states that Rudra defeated the king of Chakurakuta, who had seized the title Manaya-khetaka-kara from Meda-raja. The identity of the defeated king or the date of his defeat are not certain.

Historian P.V.P. Sastry theorizes that Rudra may have participated in a campaign of the Chola king Rajaraja II.

=== Conquest of coastal Andhra ===
Rudra appears to have captured the Daksharamam area, as attested by the 1158 CE Daksharamam inscription of his minister Inangala Brammireddi. He retained control of this territory for at least four or five years, as attested by the 1163 CE Daksharamam inscription of his brother Durgga-raja of Repalli. The Velanati Choda king Kulottunga Rajendra II appears to have captured the Daksharamam area in 1163 CE, as attested by an inscription of his minister Devana-Preggada. Rudra appears to have recaptured the area sometime later, as suggested by the 1168 CE Daksharamam inscription of his queen Dannama-devi, which records her gift of a lamp to the temple of Bhimeshvara. Rudra appears to have lost control of the area soon after: the provenance of the inscriptions of Rajendra II and his subordinates suggests that the area largely remained under the control of the Velanati Chodas until 1181 CE.

Other parts of coastal Andhra were under the control of various chiefs, some of whom were involved in the battle that resulted in the death of Rudra's father Prola II. These chiefs included such as Haihayas of Kona, the Chalukyas of Pithapuram, the Kolanis (Sarasipuras) of the Eluru region, the Kotas of Amaravati, the Komdapadumati chiefs, and the Haihayas of Palnadu. The Velanati Choda chief Rajendra II initially acknowledged the Chola suzerainty, but after the death of the Chola king Rajaraja II in c. 1172 CE, he declared sovereignty, and conquered most of the coastal Andhra region.

After the death of Rajendra II in 1181 CE, the Velanati Choda kingdom suddenly collapsed, probably because of a civil war. Around the same time, a war broke out in the Palnadu kingdom, between the Haihaya prince Nalagama and his brothers. According to the ballad Palnati-virula-charita, Nalagama sough support from Rudra. Rudra marched there accompanied by the nayakas (chiefs) of Malyala, Komaravelli, Vipparla, and Natavadi. Nalagama's alliance won the Battle of Palnadu, but Rudra's role in this seems to have been insignificant: he contributed only a thousand horsemen to Nalagama's effort.

Rudra then sent his army against the Kota chief Bhima II (also known as Dedda Bhima or Dodda Bhima) of Dharanikota, who was a son-in-law of Rajendra II. Rudra's generals - Kata (the son of Sabba-senani) and Bollama of the Malayala family - captured Dharanikota. Rudra's subordinates - the chiefs of Vipparla, Komaravelli, and Pempala - assumed the title Dodda-Bhimani-shirash-chchhedaka, which suggests that Bhima died in this battle.

Rudra appointed Bhima's son Keta II as a vassal ruler. With Keta's help, he subjugated the Komdapadumati chiefs, who controlled the western part of the Velanati kingdom. An 1185 CE Tripurantakam inscription records Rudra's grant of the Revuru village in this region, confirming that his conquest of the region. No records of the Komdapadumati chiefs dated after this year are available, suggesting that Rudra's campaign ended their dynasty.

In 1184 CE, the Velanati Choda ruler Prithvishvara, who had lost control of his ancestral territory, attempted to capture the Prolu-nadu region (Pithapuram-Kakinada area). Mallapa-deva, a member of the Vengi Chalukya family, had carved out an independent kingdom in this area after the death of Rajaraja II. Mallapa-deva sought help from Rudra-deva, who appears to have marched to Daksharamam in his support, as attested by a 1185-1186 CE inscription. Epigraphic evidence suggests that Prithvishvara defeated Mallapa-deva, and retained control of Mallapa-deva from 1185 CE until his death.

Rudra evicted the Chalukyas of Mudigonda, who controlled the Visurunadu region. The Kukanuru inscription of the Chalukya chief Kusumaditya states that he had to seek shelter in other territories for 12 years because of an upheaval in his own kingdom. This likely refers to Rudra's attack on the Chalukya kingdom; the Chalukya chiefs seem to have regained control of their principality after Rudra's death, as suggested by the Kukanuru inscription. A 1213 CE inscription of the Kakatiya general Recherla Rudra states that he forced Kusumaditya's brother Nagati-raja to flee.

=== Possible conflict with the Yadavas ===
Little information is available about the last decade of Rudra's life. Some historians have theorized that the Seuna (Yadava) king Jaitugi defeated and killed Rudra around 1195 CE, but others dispute this. This theory is based on the texts Sukti-muktavali and Chatur-varga-chintamani.

The Sukti-muktavali verse states that the Yadava chief Bhillama V conquered some territory in the battlefield of Babhru. Since Babhru and Rudra are synonyms as alternative names of Shiva, epigraphist P.B. Desai theorized that Bhillama defeated Rudra. However, according to historian P.V.P. Sastry, it is more likely that Babhru is the name of a place.

The Vrata-khanda of Hemadri's Chatur-varga-chintamani provides a poetic description of the military prowess of the Yadava king. In this description, Hemadri states that Jaitrapala (Jaitugi) sacrificed a human in the shape of Raudra, the lord of Tilinga region. According to historian A.S. Altekar, "Raudra" may be a mistake by a scribe, the verse describes Jaitugi's killing of the Kakatiya king Rudra. Altekar argues that Rudra's death explains the weakened Kakatiya power in the subsequent years. However, according to Sastry, Raudra ("[son] of Rudra") refers to Rudra's successor Mahadeva, who is known to have been killed by Jaitugi in the subsequent years. Mahadeva was a brother of Rudra: Hemadri probably mistook him for Rudra's son.

=== Administration ===
Rudra moved his capital from Anumakomda to Orugallu (present-day Warangal), and started the construction of a fort there. According to the Ganapeshvaram inscription of Ganapati, he built a township between Orumgallu and the former Kakatiya capital Anumakomda. The various localities in this township were named after the towns sacked by Rudra during his campaigns, and settled with people from these towns.

Rudra's notable generals and ministers included:

- Gangadhara of Vellaki family, who served as the administrator of Anumakomda during Prola II's reign, and the governor of Sabbi-naddu during Rudra's reign. His inscriptions record several of his religious deeds (see #Religion below).
- Inangala Brammireddi (or Inamgala Brahmireddi) held the office of peggada as attested by his Daksharamam inscription.
- Malli Nayaka, the war minister (tantra-pala)
- Peda Mallana, a son of Nanagaura of Induluri family, was the governor of Rudra's new capital Orugallu, as attested by the Shaivite text Shiva-yoga-sara.
- China Mallana, a brother of Peda, held the office of the chief accountant (peda-samprati), according to Shiva-yoga-sara.
- The Cheraku family, including Kata and his brothers, held the Cheraku-70 region as appanage. As generals, they helped the Kakatiyas subjugate the Choda chiefs Bhima and Udaya in Kanduru-nadu region, as attested by their Jammuluru inscription. Kata's son Kama and his grandson Nama also served as commanders of Rudra's armies.
- Kata, a member of the Malyala family of Samkisa-pura, was a general and also held the office of pradhani. He helped the Kakatiyas subdue the Kota kingdom, as suggested by his titles Kota-gelpata ("conqueror of Kota").
- The Recherlas of Pillalamarri, who had served the Kakatiyas for multiple generations since the time of Beta I.

According to the 1195 CE Pillalamarri inscription of his subordinate Nami Reddi, Rudra was "the resort and refuge of learned men", who loved him. The authorship of Niti-sara (or Niti-saram), a work on politics (raja-niti), is sometimes attributed to Rudra. But this is doubtful, as this attribution is based on an apocryphal verse in a single manuscript of Baddena's Niti-shastra-muktavali, and that verse mentions the author as "Pratapa-rudra", not "Rudra".

== Succession ==
The last extant record from Rudra's reign is 26 April 1195 CE Bekkallu inscription. He died childless, and his brother Mahadeva succeeded him on the throne. The Upparapalli inscription of Katayanayaka describes Mahadeva's son Ganapati as a son of Rudra: it is possible that Rudra adopted Ganapati as a son. According to the Khamdavalli inscription of Prataparudra, Rudra gave the kingdom to his younger brother Mahadeva. This suggests that Rudra himself appointed Mahadeva as his successor, possibly as a regent of Ganapati.

== Religion ==
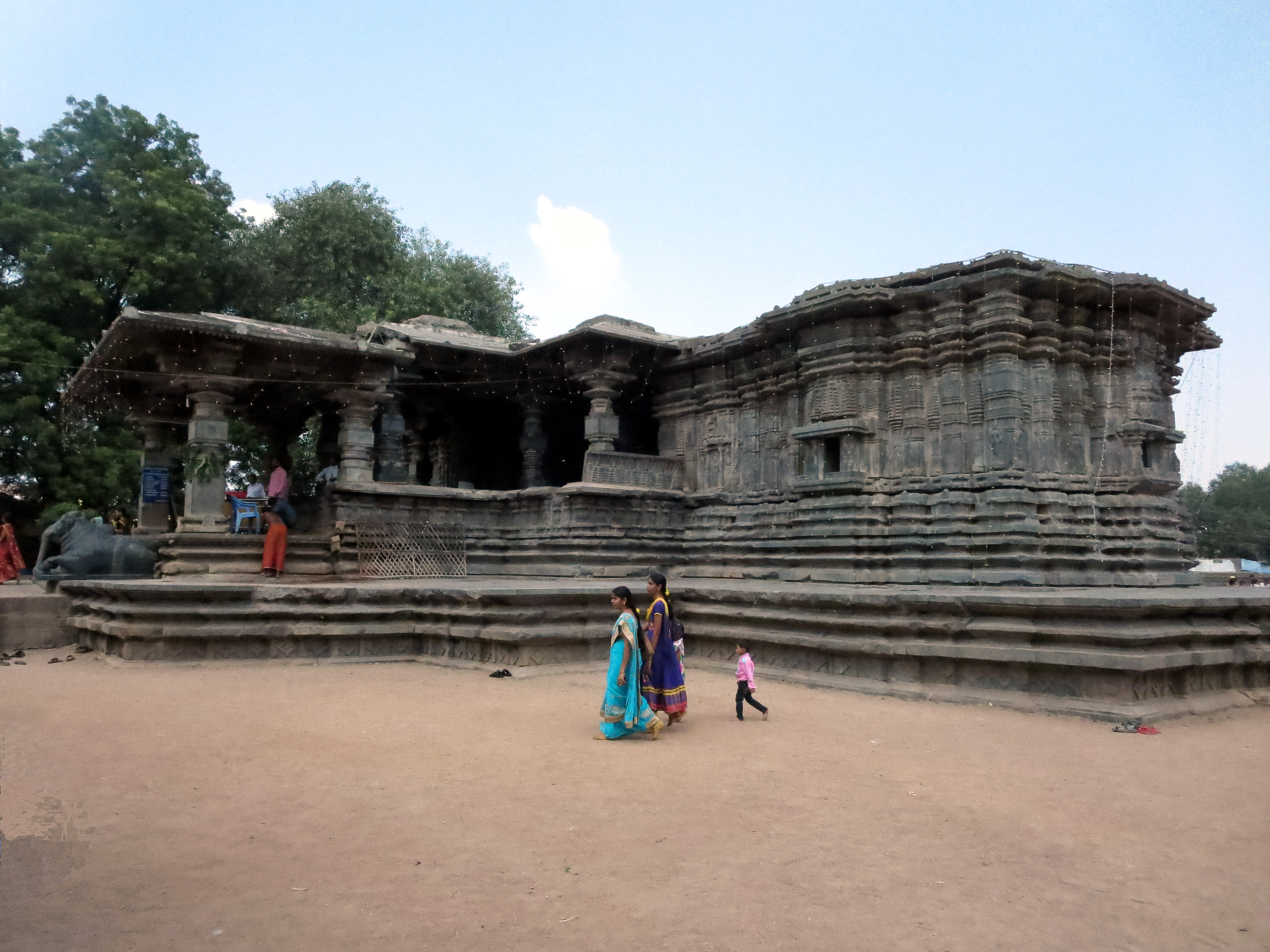
Rudreshvara temple, popularly known as the Thousand Pillar Temple

Rudra commissioned the Rudreshvara temple, popularly known as the Thousand Pillar Temple, at Anumakomda. According to the Ganapeshvaram inscription, he also constructed other temples named Rudreshvara ("Lord of Rudra") in the towns of his defeated enemies. Other people in his kingdom also built temples dedicated to Shiva: it was customary to erect a group of three temples (tri-kuta) in memory of one's relatives.

An 1185 CE Tripurantakam inscription records Rudra's grant of the Revuru village on the Krishna River to the god Tripurantaka Mahadeva.

Malli Nayaka, Rudra's minister of war, made a gift to a temple in Panugallu to acquire merit for the king. Another minister, Gangadhara, commissioned a temple dedicated to the god Prasanna-keshava. He probably also contributed to the construction of the Gamgachiya-chevuru tank near this temple. Gangadhara also built other temples in Nagunuru: Samvartakeshvara and Hidimbaehala. According to his Karimnagar inscription, he believed that the Buddha was an incarnation of Hari (Vishnu), and installed an image of the Buddha at Pattasala. He also granted an agrahara to learned Brahmanas.
