= Ganapati's Coastal Andhra Campaign =

Campaign by Kakatiya ruler Ganapati to conquer Coastal Andhra

Coastal Andhra Campaign
- Part of Ganapati Wars of Unification
Date	1201–1209 A.D
Location	Andhra Pradesh, India
Result	Kakatiya victory: Ganapatideva conquered Velanadu region

Belligerents
Kakatiyas: Kota Vamsa; Natavadi; Malyala Chiefs; Supported By : Nellore Chodas; Konidena Chodas	Velanati Chodas; Ayya Chiefs

Commanders and leaders
Ganapati (Kakatiya dynasty); Vakkadimalla Rudra; Malyala Chaunda; Nellore Chodas: Tikka Choda I Konidena Chodas: Ballaya Choda	Pruthviswara (executed); Ayya Pinni Choda (surrendered)

Ganapati’s Coastal Andhra Campaign was a major campaign initiated by Kakatiya ruler Ganapati to expand the boundaries of Kakatiya dynasty into Coastal Andhra. He began his campaign around 1201 AD by attacking Bezawada (modern Vijayawada) and quickly captured it. Then, he moved east to the island of Divi, where the Ayya chiefs ruled. They resisted strongly, but Ganapati defeated them and looted their capital. To maintain peace, he showed kindness by returning their lands, marrying two daughters of their chief, and giving their son a high position. Later, Ganapati and his allies fought against Pruthviswara, the last powerful Velanati Choda ruler, and killed him in battle. This campaign ended the Velanati rule and brought most of Coastal Andhra under Ganapati's control.

== Background ==
=== Ganapati's Ascension To The Throne ===
Ganapati’s rule started during a difficult time but became one of the most successful periods in Andhra’s history. He was a strong and active ruler who reigned for sixty-three years. Through war and smart diplomacy, he united almost all the Telugu speaking regions under his control. The fall of the Western Chalukyas and Chola Empire's helped him, as the region had broken into many small kingdoms constantly fighting each other. One of the important groups during this time were the chiefs of Velanadu. Although their power weakened after the death of Choda II around 1181 AD, records from places like Draksharamam, Pithapuram, and Sri kurmam show that a ruler named Pruthviswara still controlled the northern coastal Andhra region until his death around 1210 AD.

=== Decline of Velanati Choda's Authority ===
Some loyal supporters of Pruthviswara’s family, especially from the Divi Island region and nearby areas, accepted his leadership and helped him in battles, even though they ruled their lands as independent princes. A Telugu book from the 15th century, called Simhasana-Dvatrimsika by Goparaju, mentions that Pruthviswara ruled from his ancestral capital, Tsandavolu, in the Krishna district. This matches what find in old inscriptions and literature, confirming that the Velanati Choda family continued to rule at least a part of Coastal Andhra. However, their control was not complete, as the region was filled with many small, independent or semi-independent feudal states that limited their power.

=== Reign of Small Independent Kingdoms ===
Before Ganapati fully took power, the Andhra country was split among many local rulers. The Kolanu (Sarasipuri) chiefs controlled the area around the Kolar lake. The Chagis of Gudimetta ruled parts of the inner Krishna region, and the Nitavadis held land along the river’s north bank in what was the Kambhamet district of the old Hyderabad State. In today’s Guntur area, the Kotas and the Telugu Chodas of Konidena were in charge. Farther south, the Telugu Choda kingdom of Nellore covered the Nellore and Cuddapah districts of Andhra Pradesh and most of the Chingleput district of the old Madras State, with Nellore and Kanchi used as alternative capitals. The small chiefs of Eruva, at the junction of Nellore, Guntur, and Kurnool, accepted the rule of the Nellore Chodas, and many minor principalities also existed in the Cuddapah and Kurnool borderlands. In the north-east, parts of the region were under the Gangas of Kalinga. This was the political scene when Ganapati finally took the reins of government.

=== Planning ===
Ganapati followed a policy already planned by his predecessors, Prola II and Rudradeva, who had dreams of building a large empire. They wanted to rule not only Telangana but also the coastal regions and bring the entire Andhra country under their control. While they succeeded in conquering Telangana, their attempts to expand south and east failed because of strong resistance from the Velanati Choda chiefs. These chiefs ruled the coastal areas as representatives of the Imperial Chola emperors. However, their power weakened after the death of Choda II in 1181 AD. His grandson, Pruthviswara, tried to hold on to power but was not strong enough to control the rebellious nobles or stop the decline. Seeing this chance, Ganapati invaded the coastal districts in 1201 AD with a large army. He was supported by many local chiefs like the Kotas, Natavadis, and Malayalas.

== Campaign ==
=== Capture of Bezawada ===
Ganapati began his military campaign by attacking Bezawada (modern-day Vijayawada), which was located on the eastern edge of the Kakatiya kingdom. An inscription from 1201 AD, found at the Kanakadurga-mantapa near the Indrakila hill, mentions a Natavadi prince named Vakkadimalla Rudra. This suggests that troops from the Natavadis and likely the Kakatiyas as well were present in the city at the time. The inscription indicates that there was a battle, and soon after, Bezawada was captured by Ganapati’s army.

=== Siege of Divi ===
After capturing Bezawada, the Kakatiya army moved east towards the island of Divi, located near the mouth of the Krishna River. This island was the stronghold of the Ayya chiefs, who ruled over the rich and fertile lands of the delta. The Ayya rulers did not give up easily and put up strong resistance, relying on the strong defenses of their island fort. However, they were eventually defeated, and their wealthy capital was looted by the Kakatiya forces. In appreciation of the bravery shown by the Malyala chief Chaunda during the battle, Ganapati gave him the title Dvipi Lumthaka or Divi Churakara, meaning "plunderer of Divi Island," as mentioned in the Kondiparti inscription dated 1203 AD. Still, Ganapati did not directly take over the island. Being a clever ruler, he knew that peace and cooperation would help him build a more lasting and stable rule.

Ganapati chose to be kind to the defeated Ayya chiefs instead of punishing them. He returned their lands and even formed family ties with them by marrying Naramba and Peramba, the daughters of Ayya Pina Chodi. He also gave a position in his service to their brother, Jaya or Jayapa Senani. This smart move helped him gain their loyalty. As a result of these victories, not only did Ganapati gain control over the island of Divi, but he also likely took over the entire Velanadu region. This is supported by the Ganapesvaram inscription dated 1211 AD, which confirms that Velanadu came under his rule during this time.

=== Death of Pruthviswara ===
Although Pruthviswara was still considered the ruler of the Coastal Andhra region, his real control was limited. Inscriptions show that he only ruled the area from Draksharamam in the East Godavari district to Srikurmam in the Srikakulam district. What exactly happened after Ganapati’s conquest of Divi is not fully known. However, it seems that Pruthviswara tried to take back Divi and the other areas lost to Ganapati. He likely led a military campaign for this purpose, but it appears that his efforts ended in failure.

According to Telugu literature and inscriptions from that time, Tikka, the Telugu Choda king of Nellore, is said to have played with the head of Pruthviswara on the battlefield, showing his complete victory over him. Others, like Ballaya Chola of Kammanadu and the Kakatiya king Ganapati, also claimed they killed Pruthviswara and treated his head in the same way. This suggests that Ganapati, Tikka, and Ballaya fought together against Pruthviswara. While the exact reason for their alliance is unknown, it is likely that Pruthviswara tried to invade coastal Andhra, and these three leaders either allies or feudatories joined forces to stop him. In the battle that followed, Pruthviswara was killed. With his death, the rule of the Velanati chiefs ended, and their lands came under the control of the Kakatiya king Ganapati.

== See also ==
- Rudradeva
- Prataparudra
- Kakatiya dynasty
