= Simhana =

- Yadava-narayana, Paramabhattaraka, Parameshvara, Maharajadhiraja
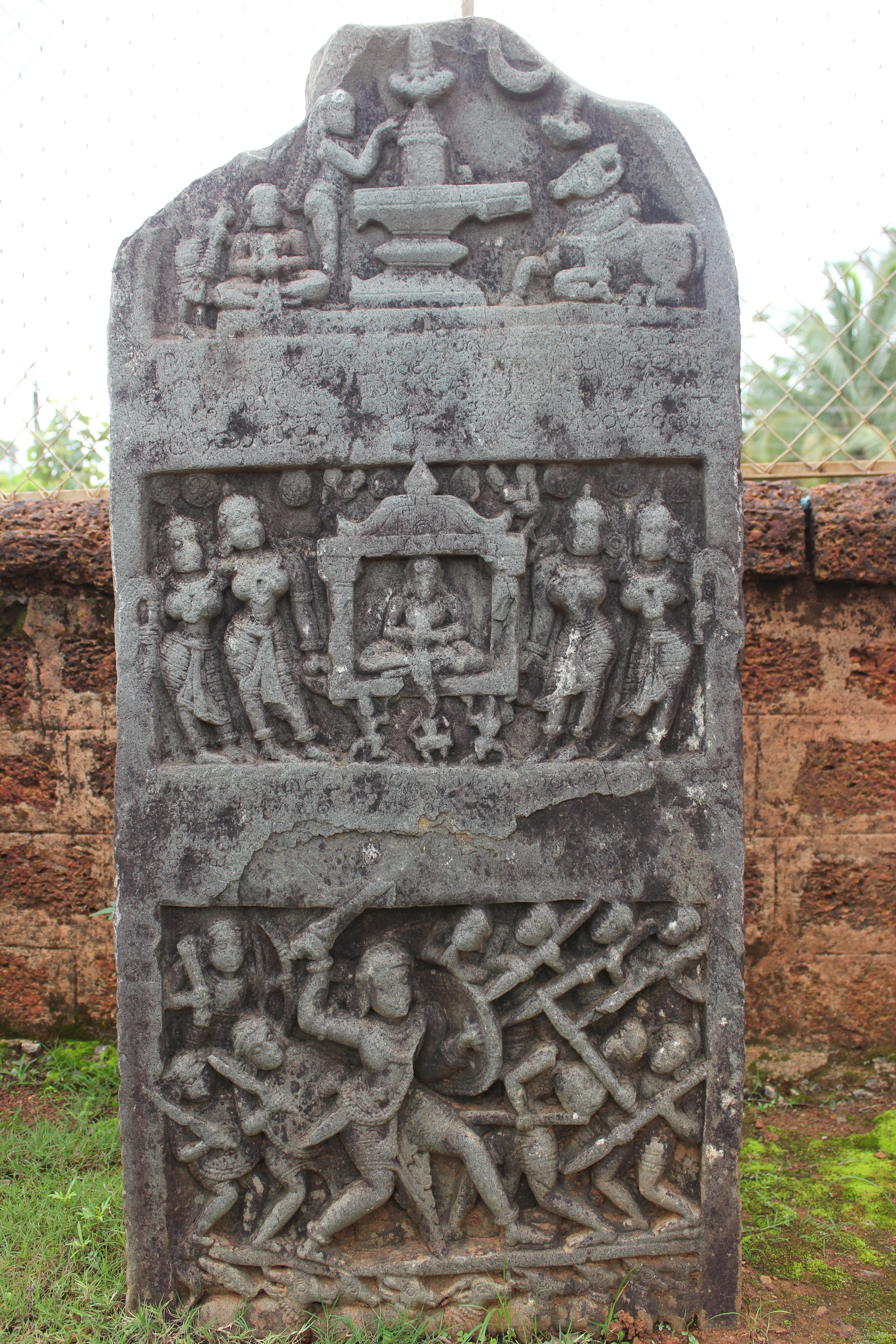
- Seuna victory stone dated to the reign of Simhana

King of Devagiri
- Reign: 1200/1210-1246
- Predecessor: Jaitugi I
- Successor: Krishna
- Born: c. 1186
- Died: 1246
- Spouse: Jehadevi; Kavaladevi
- Issue: Yuvraj Jaitugi II (father of Krishna and Mahadeva)
- Dynasty: Seuna (Yadava)
- Father: Jaitugi I
- Religion: Hinduism

Simhana (IAST: Siṃhaṇa, also transliterated as Singhana; r. c. 1210-1246 was the most powerful ruler of the Seuna (Yadava) dynasty of the Deccan region of India. He expanded his kingdom to the south at the expense of the Hoysalas, and fought the Chaulukyas and the Vaghelas for the control of the Lata region in the north. He also defeated the Paramaras of Malwa, the Shilaharas of Kolhapur and the Rattas of Belgaum. His generals subjugated several insubordinate feudatory chiefs, and the Yadava territory reached its greatest extent during his reign.

== Early life ==
Simhana, whose name is also transliterated as Singhana, was the son of his predecessor Jaitugi. His birth was believed to have been the result of the blessings of the goddess Narasimhi of Parnakheta. Therefore, he was named after this goddess.

It is not clear when Simhana ascended the throne. Jaitgui's last known inscription is dated 1196, and Simhana's earliest known inscription is dated 1197. However, other inscriptions variously suggest that Simhana ascended the throne in 1200, 1207 or 1210. Two Kandagal inscriptions, dated 1208 and 1220, are stated to have been issued in the 8th and 20th year of his reign respectively, thus suggesting that he ascended the throne in 1200. A third inscription from the same place suggests that he ascended the throne in 1210. The Kallaru stone inscription suggests that he ascended the throne in 1208–09. The Elavata, Kadkal and Kuppataru inscriptions suggest another date for his ascension. Simhana had definitely not ascended the throne in 1197, because Jaitugi is known to have appointed the Kakatiya ruler Ganapati as his vassal in 1198.

Historian A. S. Altekar theorizes that Simhana was formally associated with his father's administration as the heir apparent (yuvaraja) after 1200, which may explain why some inscriptions date his ascension as early as 1200. According to Altekar, Jaitugi most probably continued to rule until 1210, when Simhana succeeded him as the king.

On the other hand, T. V. Mahalingam theorizes that Simhana was crowned as his father's successor in 1200, and had a second coronation in 1210 to mark his conquest of the Hoysala territories. According to Mahalingam, the inscriptions that suggest an earlier date (e.g. 1200) for Simhana's coronation were found in the northern part of his kingdom. On the other hand, the inscriptions that place his coronation in 1210 were found in the southern part of his kingdom (that is, south of the Malaprabha River). A 1226-27 inscription discovered at Doni in the southern region states that sixteen years had passed since Simhana's entry in the area (nadu). This suggests that Simhana conquered this southern region in c. 1210, and therefore, the inscriptions found in this region count his reign from that year.

== Military career ==
=== Kakatiyas ===
Some later inscriptions, such as those discovered at Chikka Sakuna and Munoli, state that Simhana beheaded the king of Telanga, and placed another person on the empty throne. This suggests that he participated in his father's campaign against the Kakatiyas. As a result of these campaigns, the Kakatiya king Mahadeva was killed, and Mahadeva's son Ganapati was installed on the throne as a Yadava vassal.

Ganapati maintained cordial relations with Simhana. During the first half of his reign, Ganapati only assumed the titles of a feudatory chief. A 1228 inscription of Ganapati claims that he defeated the Latas. This suggests that he accompanied the Simhana's forces during their expedition in the Lata region of present-day southern Gujarat (see below). During the second half of his reign, Ganapati seems to have assumed an independent status. However, Simhana was an old man by this time, and remained busy with his expeditions in Gujarat. Ganapati also avoided adopting an aggressive attitude towards the Yadavas, having spent the early part of his life in their captivity. Therefore, no major conflict happened between these two kings.

=== Hoysalas ===
Simhana's grandfather Bhillama V had suffered a humiliating defeat against the Hoysala king Ballala II at Soratur. The Yadavas decided to avenge this defeat by invading the Hoysala-controlled territory. Simhana's inscriptions discovered in the region to the south of the Malaprabha River are dated as early as 1202, which suggests that the Yadavas had made inroads into this area by this time. A 1206 inscription shows that by that year, the Yadavas had conquered a part of the present-day Bijapur district, and placed it under their general Keshavadeva. By 1212, they had penetrated into the present-day Anantapur, Bellary, Chitradurga, and Shimoga districts, as attested by their inscriptions discovered in these areas. By 1213, they had annexed most of the present-day Dharwad district, as shown by an inscription discovered at Gadag. The Gadag, Paithan, and Tiluvalli inscriptions state that Simhana defeated Ballala.

The Rattas of Saundatti, who formerly acknowledged the Hoysala suzerainty, switched their allegiance to Simhana, and helped him in expanding the Yadava power southwards. Sometime before 1215, the Yadavas captured Banavasi, and Simhana's confidant Sarvadhikarin Mayideva was appointed as its governor. In 1222, he was succeeded by Vanka Ravata, an officer from Karad. By 1220, Simhana had completed his conquest of the area to the north of the Tungabhadra River. The Hoysalas were busy at their southern frontier with the Pandyas, which worked in Simhana's favour.

=== Shilaharas of Kolhapur ===
In 1216, Simhana launched an expedition against the Kohalpur Shilahara king Bhoja II. Taking advantage of the conflict between the Chalukyas, the Kalachuris, the Yadavas, and the Hoysalas, Bhoja had assumed imperial titles. By 1187, he called himself the Vikrama of the Kaliyuga. By 1205, even his protégé Somadeva had assumed imperial titles such as Paramabhattaraka ("Supreme Overlord"), Rajadhiraja ("King of kings"), and Paschima-chakravarti ("the western Chakravarti"). While the Yadavas were engaged in their campaign against the Hoysalas during 1210–1215, Bhoja seems to have attacked their kingdom. As a result, Simhana invaded the Shilahara territory, and defeated Bhoja, who fled to Panhala.

A Yadava inscription states that Simhana was "an eagle who caused the serpent in the form of the mighty ruler Bhoja, hiding in the fort of Panhala, to take a flight." This suggests that Bhoja, who was already an old man by this time, had to flee from Panhala. Nothing is known about the ultimate fate of Bhoja or his son Gandaraditya.

Epigraphic evidence suggests that the Shilahara kingdom, including the capital Kolhapur, was annexed to the Yadava kingdom. This annexation seems to have taken place before 1217, as a 1217 inscription found in the Shimoga district describes Simhana as a vajra (thunderbolt) to the Panhala fort. A 1218 inscription found at Kolhapur records the construction of a gate before the Ambabai temple by Simhana's officer Tailana.

=== Paramaras ===
Paramaras, the northern neighbours of the Yadavas, ruled the Malwa region. In the past, Simhana's grandfather Bhillama had raided their territories. Simhana's contemporary Paramara king Arjunavarman married the Hoysala princess Sarvakala, who was probably a daughter of granddaughter of the Hoysala king Ballala. Simhana's invasion of the Hoysala territory appears to have led to a fresh conflict between the Paramaras and the Yadavas.

Simhana invaded the Paramara kingdom in 1215, and according to the later Yadava court poet Hemadri, this invasion resulted in the defeat and death of Arjunavarman. The veracity of Hemadri's claim is doubtful, as the 1222 Bahal inscription mentions Arjunavarman's defeat, but not his death. The Tiluvalli inscription also states that Simhana humbled the lord of Malwa.

=== Lata, Chaulukyas and Vaghelas ===
The Chaulukya king Bhima II ruled the present-day Gujarat, located to the north-west of the Yadava territory. Simha, the Chahamana ruler of the Lata region in southern Gujarat, was originally a Chaulukya feudatory, but had later shifted his allegiance to the Paramaras. After Simhana's victory over the Paramaras, he found himself in a tough situation, and re-accepted the Chaulukya suzerainty. The Chaulukya chronicle Kirti-Kaumudi states that the Chaulukya general Lavanaprasada (of Vaghela family) forced Simhana to retreat.

In 1220, Simhana sent a stronger army to Lata. This army was led by his general Kholeshvara, who held the fief of the neighbouring Khandesh and Vidarbha regions. At this time, the Chaulukya throne had been seized by an usurper named Jayantasimha, and therefore, the Chaulukyas were unable to help Simha. According to Hammira-mada-mardana, Simha and his brother Sindhuraja died fighting the Yadavas. The 1228 Ambe inscription of Kholeshvara describes his victory, and also mentions that Simha was killed in the battle. Sindhuraja's son Shankha (alias Sangramasimha) was taken prisoner by the Yadavas. Simhana later released Shankha, and allowed him to rule Lata as a Yadava feudatory.

Shankha remained loyal to Simhana in the later years. Meanwhile, the Chaulukya general Lavanaprasada invaded Lata, and captured the important port city of Khambhat. The Chaulukya minister Vastupala was appointed as its governor in 1219. Sometime later, while the Chaulukya forces were busy suppressing a revolt in the Marwar region, Shankha attacked Bharuch, but was forced to retreat by Vastupala. Subsequently, he launched another invasion of the Chaulukya kingdom with Simhana's assistance. The Kirti-Kaumudi attests that this invasion caused a massive panic in Gujarat. The exact details of this invasion have been obscured by the various poetic legends, none of which give a date for it. According to these legends, Shankha convinced Simhana and the Paramara king Devapala to send a joint expedition to Gujarat. Simhana's force was led by Kholeshvara, and Shankha himself led one of the invading armies. Lavanaprasada resolved the threat by creating a rift between the invading allies. One of his spies stole Devapala's favourite horse, and another spy gave it to Shankha claiming that it was a gift from Devapala. Meanwhile, a forged letter was made to fall in Simhana's hands: in this letter, Devapala had purportedly assured Shankha that he would attack Simhana's army in Gujarat, and had also urged him to kill Simhana to avenge his father's death. This letter convinced Simhana that Shankha and Devapala were conspiring against him.

It appears that Simhana withdrew from the planned invasion, and the Chaulukya-Yadava conflict came to end in c. 1232 with a peace treaty. Historian A. S. Altekar speculates that Simhana must have received considerable wealth for agreeing to this peace treaty, in addition to the confirmation of his protectorate over the Lata region. The 13th-century text Lekhapaddhati, which provides specimens for different types of letters, includes a text of the peace treaty between Lavanaprasada and Simhana. However, this appears to be a specimen rather than a true historical document.

In the 1240s, Lavanaprasada's grandson Visaladeva usurped the power in Gujarat, and became a monarch. During his reign, Simhana's forces invaded Gujarat unsuccessfully. Simhana's general Rama (a son of Kholeshvara) was killed in this campaign.

The Yadavas' conflict with Gujarat ultimately weakened both the kingdoms, and paved way for the Muslim conquest of these kingdoms half a century after Simhana's death.

=== Southern feudatories ===
The Ratta chiefs ruled a small principality in the present-day Belgaum district, and kept shifting their allegiance between the dominant imperial powers of the region. Sometime during 1228–1238, Simhana's general Bichana appears to have conquered the Ratta principality. The last Ratta ruler was Lakshmideva II, and he is last known to have ruled in 1228. By 1238, Bichana ruled the former Ratta territory as a feudatory of Simhana.

Bichana also subdued other chiefs, such as the Guttas of Dharwad, the Kadambas of Hangal, and the Kadambas of Goa. These chiefs kept shifting their allegiance between the Hoysalas and the Yadavas, and tried to become independent whenever presented with an opportunity. Bichana inflicted severe punishments on these chiefs for their insubordination. In 1237, the Gutta chief rebelled against Simhana, and even raided the Yadava territory. Simhana sent a 30,000-strong cavalry against him: this army captured the Gutti fort.

=== Other victories ===
The Yadava records contain exaggerated accounts of Simhana's other victories. For example, one inscription states that Simhana was:

a moon to the lotus Bhoja, an axe to the forest of Arjuna, a furious storm blast to the feeble crowd of the Gurjaras, a thunderbolt on the mountain Magadha, a Rama to that Pulastya the Chola, a Shiva to the Gauda poison, the bestower of new widowhood on the dames of the lord of the horse... a river raging flood in dashing upon the massive bank Ballala, a conqueror of Vihansaraja.

The court poet Hemadri mentions that Simhana captured the elephant force of King Jajalla, and ended the sovereignty of King Kakkula. The name Jajalla sounds like that of the Ratnapura Kalachuri rulers of present-day Chhattisgarh, but no king named Jajalla was a contemporary of Simhana. The last known ruler bearing this name was Jajalla II, who had died by 1170. The name Kakkula sounds like that of the Tripuri Kalachuri rulers, but the last king with a similar name was Kokalla II, who had died around 200 years before Simhana's ascension. It is possible that these victories refer to Simhana's successes in occasional clashes with local chiefs at his north-eastern frontier. His armies may have penetrated their territories, as suggested by the discoveries of a few coins of Simhana in Chhattisgarh. Historian A. S. Altekar notes that a king named Kakakla is known to have ruled a part of southern Karnataka, and wonders if this king is Hemadri's Kakkula.

A 1206 Patan inscription claims that the kings of Mathura and Varanasi had felt the menace of the Yadava power. The accuracy of these claims is doubtful, as they are not supported by any historical evidence. The Ambe inscription states that Simhana defeated king Ramapala of Varanasi, but no such king is known to have ruled Varanasi during Simhana's reign. At best, it is possible that Simhana defeated some local chiefs who claimed to be descendants of the former rulers of Mathura and Varanasi. These kings may have described themselves as the lords of Mathura and Varanasi, just like the Simhana's family claimed descent from the ancient Yadavas and claimed to have ruled their ancient capital Dvaravati.

The 1206 Patan inscription also claims that an obscure general of Simhana defeated a Muslim ruler. This claim is also doubtful, and at best, Simhana's army may have faced a frontier skirmish with a Muslim army during one of its expeditions in Malwa or Gujarat.

Some Yadava inscriptions also credit Simhana and his generals (Kholeshvara, Rama and Bichana) with victories in other parts of India. According to these inscriptions, Simhana or his generals defeated the kings of Panchala, Nepala, Anga, Vanga (or Vengi), Kalinga, Chera, Pallava, and Sindhu. These conventional poetic claims seem to be purely imaginary, and there is no evidence of the Yadava army having penetrated these distant regions. At best, Pallava here may refer to Kopperunchinga, whose Kadava dynasty was related to the ancient Pallavas.

== Territorial extent ==
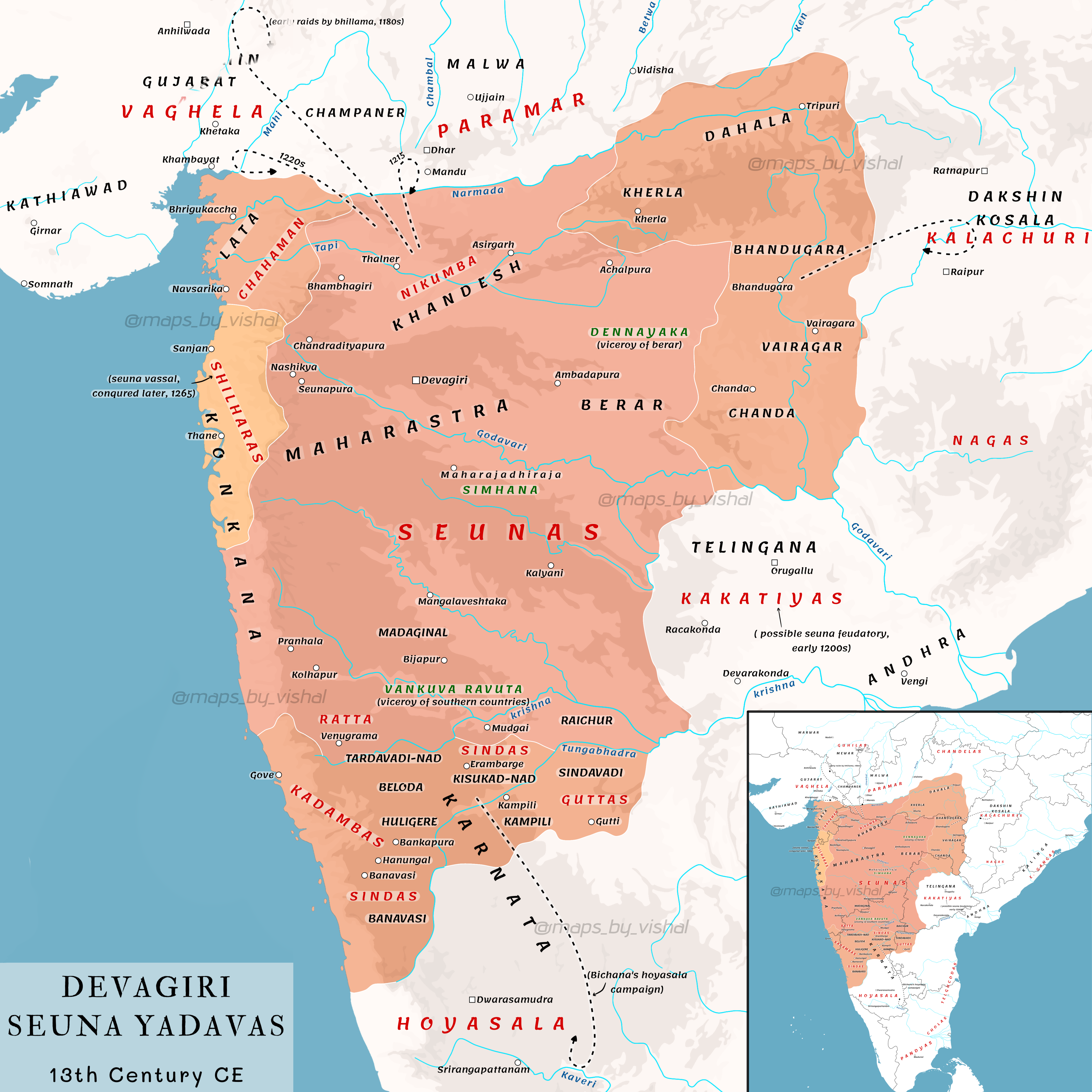
Map of the Yadavas at their greatest territorial extent, during the reign of Simhana.

Simhana is regarded as the greatest ruler of his dynasty. The Yadava kingdom reached its greatest extent during his reign. In the north, it probably extended up to the Narmada River. In the south, his kingdom extended up to the Tungabhadra River, and included Belvola and Banavasi. In the west, it touched the Arabian Sea, and in the east, it included the western part of Andhra: Simhana's inscriptions have been discovered in the present-day Anantapur and Kurnool districts.

Simhana consolidated the Yadava rule in the newly annexed territories by posting his trusted lieutenants there. At his northern frontier, he assigned the fiefs of Khandesh and Vidarbha to his general Kholeshvara. At his southern frontier, he assigned the fief of southern Karnataka to his general Bichana.

Kholeshvara was born to a Brahmin named Trivikrama, but adopted a warrior role, and defeated several small chiefs in the Vidarbha and Khandesh regions. These chiefs included Lakshmideva of Bhambhagiri (modern Bhamer), Hemadri of Khandesh, and Bhoja of Chanda (in present-day Madhya Pradesh). Since Kholeshvara came from a Brahmin family, he appears to have had a soft corner for the Brahmins, as suggest by his establishments of a number of agrahara (Brahmin settlements).

Bichana, the son of Chikkadeva, was born in a Vaishya family. He played an important role in the anti-Hoysala campaigns, and one of his inscriptions claims that he advanced as far as the Kaveri River, where he set up a victory pillar. He succeeded Jagadala Purushottama-deva as Simhana's viceroy in the southern part of the Yadava kingdom, in 1230.

== Cultural activities ==
The authorship of Sangita-ratnakara, a work on music, is attributed to Simhana's court poet Sharanga-deva. A commentary on this work is attributed to Simhana himself. It is not certain if Simhana actually wrote this commentary, or if he was the patron of its actual author.

Simhana's courtiers included two noted astronomers: Anantadeva and Changadeva. Anantadeva wrote commentaries on Brahmagupta's Brahma-sphuta-siddhanta and Varahamihira's Brihat-jataka. Changadeva established a college of astronomy in Patana town of Khandesh region, in the memory of his grandfather Bhaskaracharya.

== Last days ==
Simhana had two wives, named Jeha-devi and Kavala-devi. His son Jaitugi II (not to be confused with his father Jaitugi I) is known to have been the yuvaraja (heir apparent) in 1229, but he probably died before Simhana. Therefore, Simhana was succeeded by his grandson Krishna.

According to A. S. Altekar, Krishna's inscriptions suggest that 2 November 1248 fell in the second year of his reign, while 25 December 1248 fell in the third year of his reign. Therefore, Altekar concludes that Simhana most probably died in either November of December 1246, when Krishna succeeded him.

According to T. V. Mahalingam (1957), there are at least six inscriptions which suggest that Simhana ruled at least until October 1247. Some Yadava inscriptions suggest that Krishna was ruling in March 1246. This indicates that Krishna was associated Simhana's administration since at least 1246, and succeeded him in the last quarter of 1247.
