= Prolunadu =

Historical region in the Indian state of Andhra Pradesh

Prolunadu (prōlunāḍu) was an ancient region located in the Indian state of Andhra Pradesh, corresponding to parts of the present-day Pithapuram, Kakinada, and Peddapuram mandals within the Kakinada district. It was situated south of Pithapuram and north of the lower Godavari River, encompassing areas to the east of the Eleru River, a tributary of the Godavari. The region is now part of Kakinada district.

Prolunadu served as an administrative division of the Eastern Chalukyan kingdom and was established by Vishnuvardhana III in 742 CE. During the Chalukyan era, it was an important administrative unit. It was one of the historical regions of Andhra, alongside other divisions such as Pakanadu, Palnadu, Kammanadu, and Renadu.

Prolunadu is mentioned as a vishaya (administrative division) in medieval inscriptions, often noted in records of land grants and other royal decrees.
