= Jaitugi =

Yadava king
- Reign: c. 1191–1200
- Predecessor: Bhillama V
- Successor: Simhana
- Maha-Pradhana: Sankama
- Born: c. 1165
- Issue: Simhana
- Dynasty: Seuna (Yadava)
- Father: Bhillama V
- Religion: Hinduism

Jaitugi (1165–1200), also known as Jaitrapala, was a ruler of the Seuna (Yadava) dynasty from 1191 to 1200.

== Early life ==
Jaitugi was the son of his predecessor Bhillama V, who overthrew the Chalukya suzerainty to become independent. The last extant record from Bhillama's reign is dated August 1191, while the earliest extant record from Jaitugi's reign is dated December 1192. The Bijapur inscription, dated 25 December 1196, states that it was issued during the sixth year of Jaitugi's reign. This evidence suggest that Jaitugi ascended the throne in late 1191.

== Military career ==
=== Victory over the Kakatiyas ===
During the reign of his father Bhillama, Jaitugi participated in his father's wars against the Hoysala king Ballala II, resisting the enemy's attempts to capture Kalyani and Devagiri. Bhillama ultimately suffered a defeat against the Hoysalas. Taking advantage of weakened Yadava power, the Kakatiyas had invaded the eastern part of the Yadava kingdom. All three dynasties - the Yadavas, the Hoysalas and the Kakatiyas - were former feudatories of the Chalukyas of Kalyani. The Yadavas considered themselves as true successors of the Chalukyas, and therefore, expected the Kakatiyas to recognize their suzerainty.

Once the Yadava-Hoysala conflict subsided, and the Yadava power stabilized, Jaitugi launched a successful campaign against the Kakatiyas around 1194. The Yadava court poet Hemadri describes this victory as follows:

He (Jaitugi) assumed the sacrificial vow on the holy ground of the battle field, and throwing a great many kings into the fire of his prowess by means of ladles of his weapons, performed a human sacrifice by immolating a victim in the shape of the fierce Raudra, the lord of the Tailangas, and vanquished the three worlds.

Jaitugi is known to have defeated the Kakatiya king Mahadeva, who reached as far as the Yadava capital Devagiri, as attested by the Garavapada inscription. According to one theory, the above verse refers to the defeat and death of Mahadeva's predecessor and brother Rudra, around 1195. Hemadri's prashasti (eulogy) actually names the slain Kakatiya king as "Raudra" (not "Rudra"). The Sanskrit word-formation "Raudra" can be translated as "[son] of Rudra", but Rudra is not known to have a son. According to historian A. S. Altekar, "Raudra" is a clerical mistake for "Rudra", possibly made by a scribe who was "anxious to differentiate between the two consecutive words in the expression rudrasya rudrakriteh". Altekar therefore concludes that such a word-formation does not refer to a brother. Besides, Rudra's death in the war can explain the weakened power of kakatiya Dynasty. Historian P.V.P. Sastry opposes this theory, arguing that no other evidence supports it, and that Hemadri probably mistook Mahadeva for Rudra's son.

Ganapati, the son of Rudra's successor Mahadeva, was taken prisoner by the Yadavas in a battle. Some years later (possibly in 1198), Mahadeva was also killed in a battle against the Yadavas. Jaitugi tried to bring the Kakatiya territories under his direct rule, but failed to do so. Therefore, around 1198, he decided to release Ganapati and let him rule the Kakatiya kingdom as a Yadava feudatory. Ganapati appears to have remained loyal to the Yadavas throughout his life.

=== Managuli inscription claims ===
The Managuli (or Mangoli) inscription claims that Jaitugi defeated the Cholas, the Pandyas, the Malavas (the Paramaras of Malwa), the Latas, the Gurjaras (the Chaulukyas), the Turushkas, and the kings of Nepala and Panchala. This claim is not supported by any historical evidence, and appears to be an empty boast.

At best, it is possible that the Yadavas were victorious in some frontier skirmishes in the northern neighbouring regions of Malwa and Lata. The Yadava general Sahadeva may have raided Malwa while the Paramara king Subhatavarman was occupied in a conflict in the Lata region.

== Last days ==
Jaitugi was succeeded by his son Simhana. It is not clear when this succession took place. Jaitgui's last inscription is dated 1196. Different records variously suggest that the first regnal year of his successor Simhana was 1200, 1207 or 1210. One inscription of Simhana is dated 1197. But since Jaitugi is credited with appointment of Ganapati as a Kakatiya vassal around 1198, it does not appear that Simhana was the king in 1197. According to historian A. S. Altekar, it is possible that Simhana was formally associated with his father's administration as the heir apparent (yuvaraja) after 1200, and ascended the throne in 1210. Therefore, Atlekar dated the end of Jaitugi's reign to 1210. On the other hand, historian T. V. Mahalingam believes that Simhana succeeded Jaitugi in 1200, and had a second coronation in 1210, when he defeated the Hoysalas in the south. This theory is based on the fact that the inscriptions which date Simhana's ascension to 1210 were found in the southern part of his kingdom.

== Administration ==
The prime minister (maha-pradhana) of Jaitugi was Sankama, who was also a general and held the fief of Tardavadi one thousand. The credit for Jaitugi's military victories over the Kakatiyas largely goes to Sankama.

The Chalukyas feudatories who remained loyal to Bhillama and Jaitugi included the Nikumbha brothers Soi-deva and Hemadi-deva, who ruled in Khandesh.

Jaitugi patronized several scholars, including Lakshmidhara, the son of the astronomer Bhaskaracharya. Lakshmidhara served as Jaitugi's Court Poet, and excelled as a scholar.
