= Recherla Rudra =

12th-13th century military commander and administrator in region now part of India

Commander-in-chief of the Kakatiya army
- Monarch: Mahadeva

Regent of the Kakatiya dynasty
- Monarch: Ganapati

Personal details
- Born: 12th century
- Died: 13th century
- Profession: Administrator and commander-in-chief of Kakatiya army

Military service
- Allegiance: Kakatiya dynasty
- Commands: Kakatiya Army

Rudra of Recherla (IAST: Recerla) family, also known as Rudrireddi or Recherla Rudra Reddy, was a 12th-13th century military commander, administrator and vassal of the Kakatiya kingdom of present-day India. Around 1198 CE, the Kakatiya king Mahadeva was killed in a campaign against the Seunas (Yadavas), and his son Ganapatideva was captured by the enemy. Rudra administered the kingdom in Ganapati deva's name, and reinstated him on the throne after helping his release. Rudra established the Palampeta town, and commissioned the Ramappa Temple there.

== Family background ==
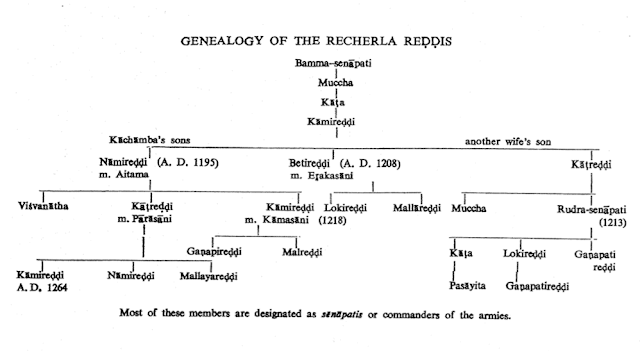
Family tree of Recherla Reddi chiefs; Rudra is shown as Rudra-senāpati (1213)

Rudra is also known as Rudrireddi, "Recharla Rudrareddy", "Rudra Reddy", and Rudra-senani. He was born to mother Bejjama alias Bejjamba and father Katreddi (or Kad-reddi) alias Kataya. Rudra's 1213 CE Palampet inscription, which calls him the "lord of Recherla", describes his lineage as "famous and most noble". It names Brahma sena-pati (commander) as the progenitor of his family, and suggests that Brahma raided Kanchi as a Kakatiya general. His descendants included Kataya, who was also a military general and "conqueror of foes". Kataya's son Kama defeated Manthenya Gunda as a commander of the Kakatiya king Prola's army. Kama's son Kataya (II), the father of Rudra, was also a general and a devotee of Shiva.

== Military career ==
Rudra served as the commander-in-chief of the Kakatiya army during the reign of the Kakatiya king Mahadeva. In 1198-1199 CE, Mahadeva was killed in a battle against the Seuna (Yadava) kingdom, and his son Ganapati was captured by the enemy. During Ganapati's captivity, Rudra appears to have handled the administration in Ganapati's name, as suggested by his titles Kakatiya-rajya-bhara-dhaureya and Kakati-rajya-samartha. Epigraphic evidence suggests that he suppressed rebellions from feudatories and repulsed invasions. The 1218 CE Nattaramesvaram inscription states that Rudra defeated an obscure king named Nagati, forcing him to flee to Kolavenu region. This event happened during the reign of Mahadeva, or shortly after his death. Rudra's Palampet inscription describes how he rescued the Kakatiya kingdom from grave misfortune:

He forsooth cut off the head of a haughty feudatory, and set it up for public view, stuck upon the top of a lofty flag-staff, as a scarecrow to frighten the flocks of these wild beasts that are hostile kings.

— Palampet inscription of Rudra

Ganapati was released from Yadava captivity sometime in 1199 CE. The Ramakrishnapuram inscription states that Rudra reinstated Ganapati on the throne.

According to some scholars, such as M. Somasekhara Sarma, Rudra also repulsed an invasion by the Chola ruler Kulottunga III. Others, such as P. V. P. Sastry dispute this in absence of concrete evidence.

According to the Godiasla (Upparapally) inscription, Rudra's brahmana minister Rajanayaka defeated one Godhumarati at Bokkera, captured Udayagiri, and drove away Padi-raya.

== Palampet ==
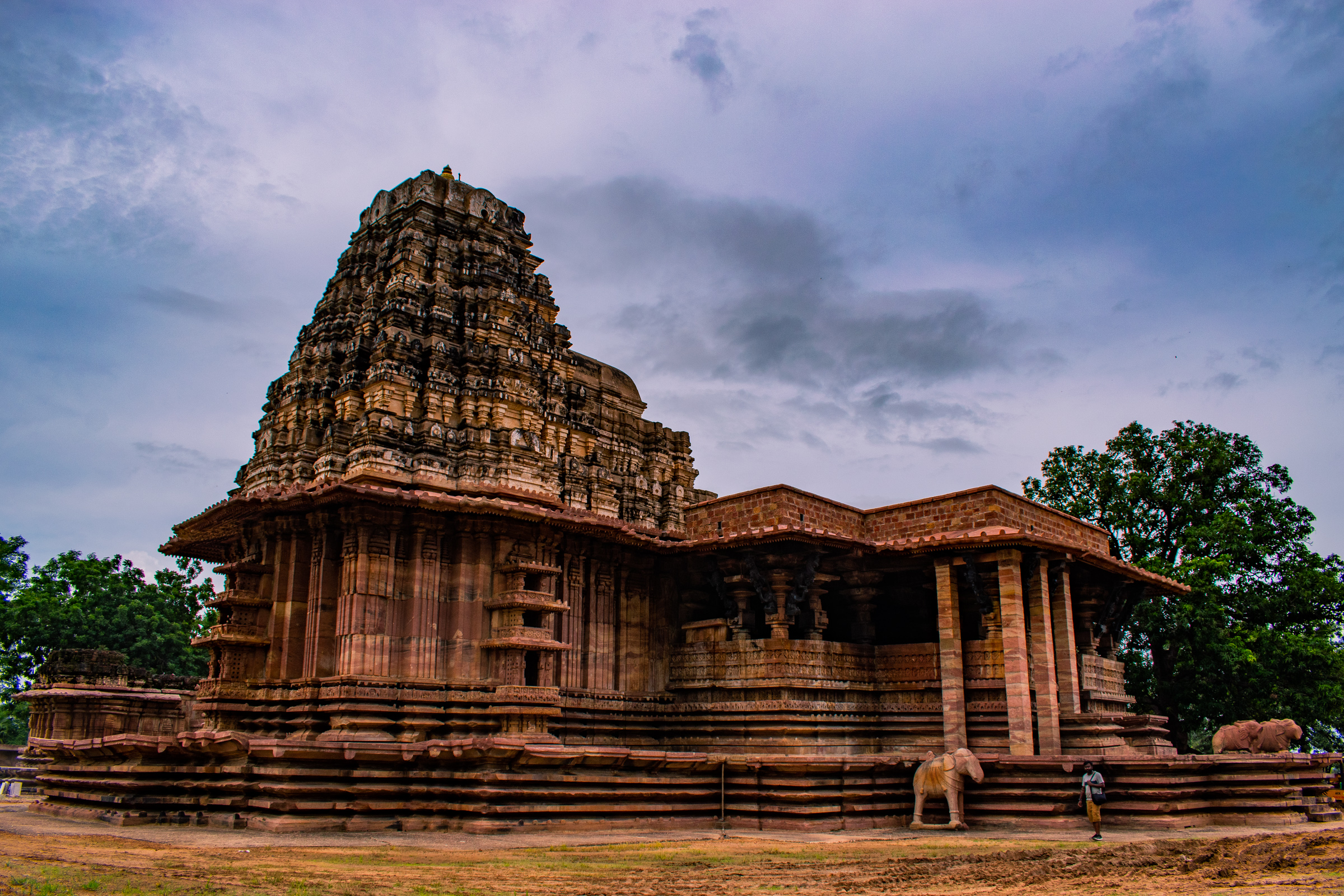
Ramappa Temple at Palampet

Rudra established the town of Palampet and commissioned the construction of the Ramappa Temple there, as attested by a 1213 CE inscription. Although Palampet is now a small village, it was an important town during the Kakatiya period. The temple is also called Rudreshvara ("Lord of Rudra"), a word play on the name of the builder (Recherla Rudra) and the deity (Rudra being another name for Shiva).

According to the Palampet inscription, Rudra granted the village of Nekkonda to the temple. He also endowed the temples of Rudreshvara, Kateshvara and Kameshvara with the village of Nadakude. In addition, he granted the villages of Upparapalli and Borlapalli to the god Gaurisha (Shiva) on 31 March 1213.
