= Jayapa Senani =

Indian military commander

Gaja-Senani (Elephant Commander) Jayapa Senani

Military General
- In office 1203–1235
- Monarch: Ganapatideva

Personal details
- Parent: Pinni Choda (father)

Military service
- Allegiance: Kakatiya Dynasty
- Battles/wars: Ganapati Deva's Coastal Andhra Campaign; Ganapatideva's First Southern Expedition

Jayapa or Jaya was a military commander (senani) under the Kakatiya king Ganapati-deva (r. c. 1199-1262 CE), whose core territory included the Telugu-speaking region in present-day Andhra Pradesh and Telangana.

Jayapa was a member of the Ayya family of the Divi island in the Krishna River delta. After Ganapati invaded the island, his family accepted the Kakatiya suzerainty, and Jayapa entered the Kakatiya service as a military commander. Ganapati later appointed him as the governor of newly-conquered territories, including Vela-nadu. Jayapa wrote Nṛutta Ratnavali, a Sanskrit-language treatise on dancing and choreography.

== Early life ==
Jayapa, also known as Jaya, belonged to the Ayya family of the Divi island in the Krishna River delta. Jayapa's father Pinni Choda (or Pina Chodi) was the ruler of the island. The Kakatiya king Ganapati invaded the island sometime around or before 1203 CE, as suggested by the 1203 CE Kondaparti inscription and another 1241 CE inscription of his Malayala chiefs. The Ayyas accepted the Kakatiya suzerainty, and Ganapati allowed them to retain the control of the island. Jayapa entered the Kakatiya service as a commander (senani), as attested by his 1231 CE Ganapesvaram inscription. His sisters - Naramba and Peramba - married Ganapati.

== Military career ==
Ganapati appointed Jayapa of Ayya family as the governor of the newly-conquered Vela-nadu region, as attested by his 1213 CE Chebrolu inscription. The appointment possibly happened earlier than 1213 CE, but this is not certain, as Jayapa's Chandavolu inscription is partially built in a wall, rendering its date unreadable.

The 1213 CE Chebrolu inscription of Jayapa refers to Ganapati's military campaign against the southern kings. It states that upon his return from this campaign, Ganapati conferred the lordship of the southern region to Jayapa. The identity of the "southern region is not certain, but they were most probably the Nellore Choda chiefs, who were Chola vassals. Ganapati installed Tikka, a member of the Nellore Choda family and a rival claimant to the throne, as the ruler of Nellore. The 1231 CE Ganapesvaram inscription of Jayapa states that he subdued several countries including Chola, Kalinga, Seuna, Brihat-Karnata, and Lata; he also annexed Vela-nadu and Dvipa (Divi). It appears that Tikka faced invasion from rulers or chiefs belonging to these countries, and Ganapati helped Tikka repulse their invasion.

Jayapa led the Kakatiya elephant force, as suggested by his title gaja-senani ("elephant commander").

== Cultural contributions ==
Jayapa composed Nrutta Ratnavali (IAST: Nṛtta Ratnāvalī), a Sanskrit-language treatise on dancing and choreography. Both Desi and Margi forms of dances have been described in Nrutta Ratnavali. It contains eight chapters. Folk dance forms like Perani, Prenkhana, Suddha Nartana, Carcari, Rasaka, Danda Rasaka, Siva Priya, Kanduka Nartana, Bhandika Nrityam, Carana Nrityam, Chindu, Gondali and Kolatam are described. In the first chapter the author deals with discussion of the differences between Marga and desi, tandava and lasya, Natya and nritta. In the 2nd and 3rd chapters he deals with angikabhinaya, caris, Sthanakas and mandalas. In the 4th Chapter Karnas, angaharas and recakas are described. In following chapters he described the local dance forms i.e. desi nritya. In the last chapter he deals with art and practice of dance.

Jayapa built a temple (Ganapeswara) in the honour of Ganapatideva and made a grant of many villages to the temple (1231 CE). He built another temple (Chodeswara) in the name of his father Pinna Choda in Chebrolu (Guntur district) and made a grant of Modukuru village to meet the temple expenses. According to the Chebrolu inscription (21 April 1235 CE) he also built two-storied quarters in two rows for Devadasis (Temple dancers) in front of the temple.

== Bibliography ==
- P. V. P. Sastry (1978). N. Ramesan (ed.). The Kākatiyas of Warangal. Hyderabad: Government of Andhra Pradesh. OCLC 252341228.
- N. Venkataramanayya; M. Somasekhara Sarma (1960). "The Kakatiyas of Warangal". In Ghulam Yazdani (ed.). The Early History of the Deccan Parts VII - XI. Vol. IX: The Kākatīyas of Warangal. Oxford University Press. ISBN 9788170691259. OCLC 59001459.
- N. Venkataramanayya; P. V. P. Sastry (1957). "The Kākatīyas". In R. S. Sharma (ed.). A Comprehensive history of India: A.D. 985-1206. Vol. 4 (Part 1) (1987 reprint ed.). Indian History Congress / People's Publishing House. ISBN 978-81-7007-121-1.
