= Recherla Reddis =

Military and political dynasty in medieval Telangana

- 1025 -1323
- Recherla Reddis Territory under the reign of Recherla Rudra Reddy
- Status: Dynasty
- Common languages: Telugu, Sanskrit
- Religion: Hinduism
- Government: Monarchy
- History
  - Established: 1025 -1323

The Recherla Reddis were the Mahasamantas (Great Feudatories) under the Kakatiya dynasty in present-day Telangana during the 12th and 13th centuries. They ruled over the regions from Amanagallu in Nalgonda district, Pillalamarri, Suryapet district, to Mulugu in Warangal district, Narsampet, Elakurthi in Karimnagar district, up to Huzurabad. They constructed numerous temples, tanks and reservoirs in this region, Epigraphic records from regions such as Pillalamarri and surrounding areas refer to members of the Recherla family in administrative and military roles.

== Origins and rise ==
Recherla Reddis belonged to the Reddy caste. According to Genealogy, the family traces its descent from Brahma Senani (Bammi Reddi), a general who served the early Kakatiya ruler Beta I. The dynasty rose to prominence through military merit, eventually governing significant territories in the modern-day Suryapet, Nalgonda, and part of old Warangal including Palampeta and Mulugu regions. They were instrumental in the expansion of the Kakatiya Empire under Prola II and Rudradeva.

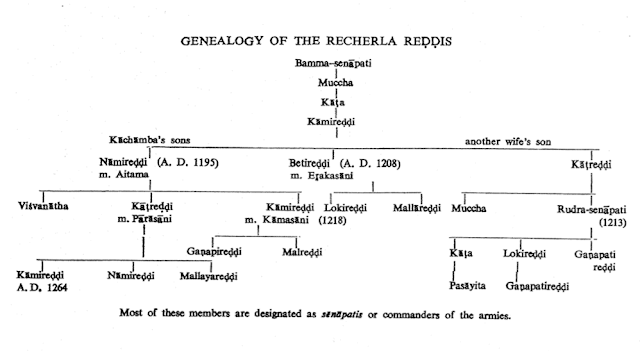
Family Tree of Recherla Reddy Chiefs

== Contributions ==
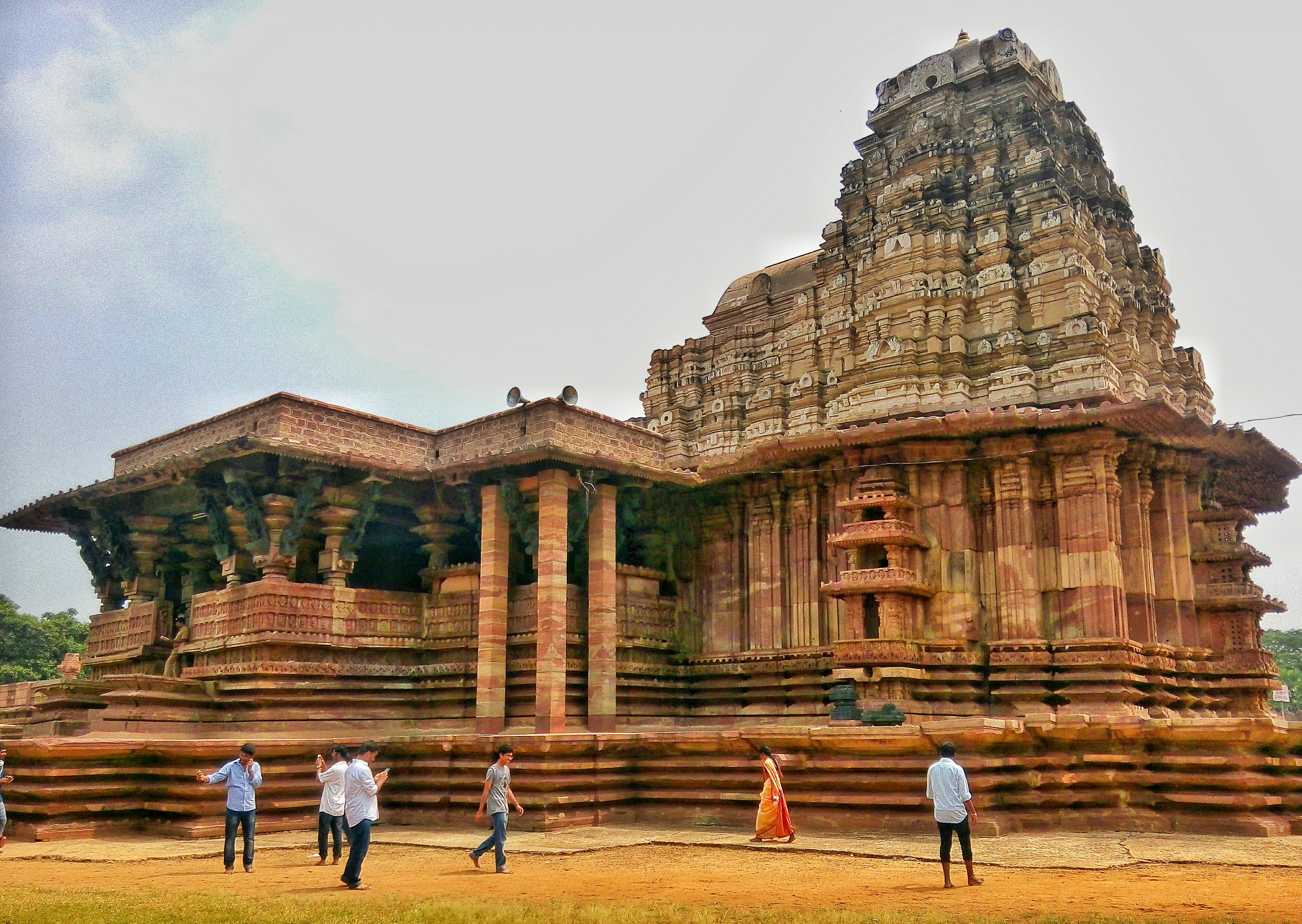
Ramappa Temple built by Recherla Rudra Reddy of Recherla Reddis Dynasty.

Recharla Rudra Reddy: Following the death of King Mahadeva and the captivity of Ganapati Deva, Rudrareddi acted as the protector of the realm. He is credited with constructing the Ramappa Temple (Rudreshwara Temple) in 1213 CE.

The sons of Kamireddi — Beti Reddi and Nami Reddi transformed Pillalamarri, Suryapeta district into a major cultural and religious hub.

Nameshwara Temple: Built by Nami Reddi in 1202 CE. It contains extensive inscriptions detailing the family's genealogy.

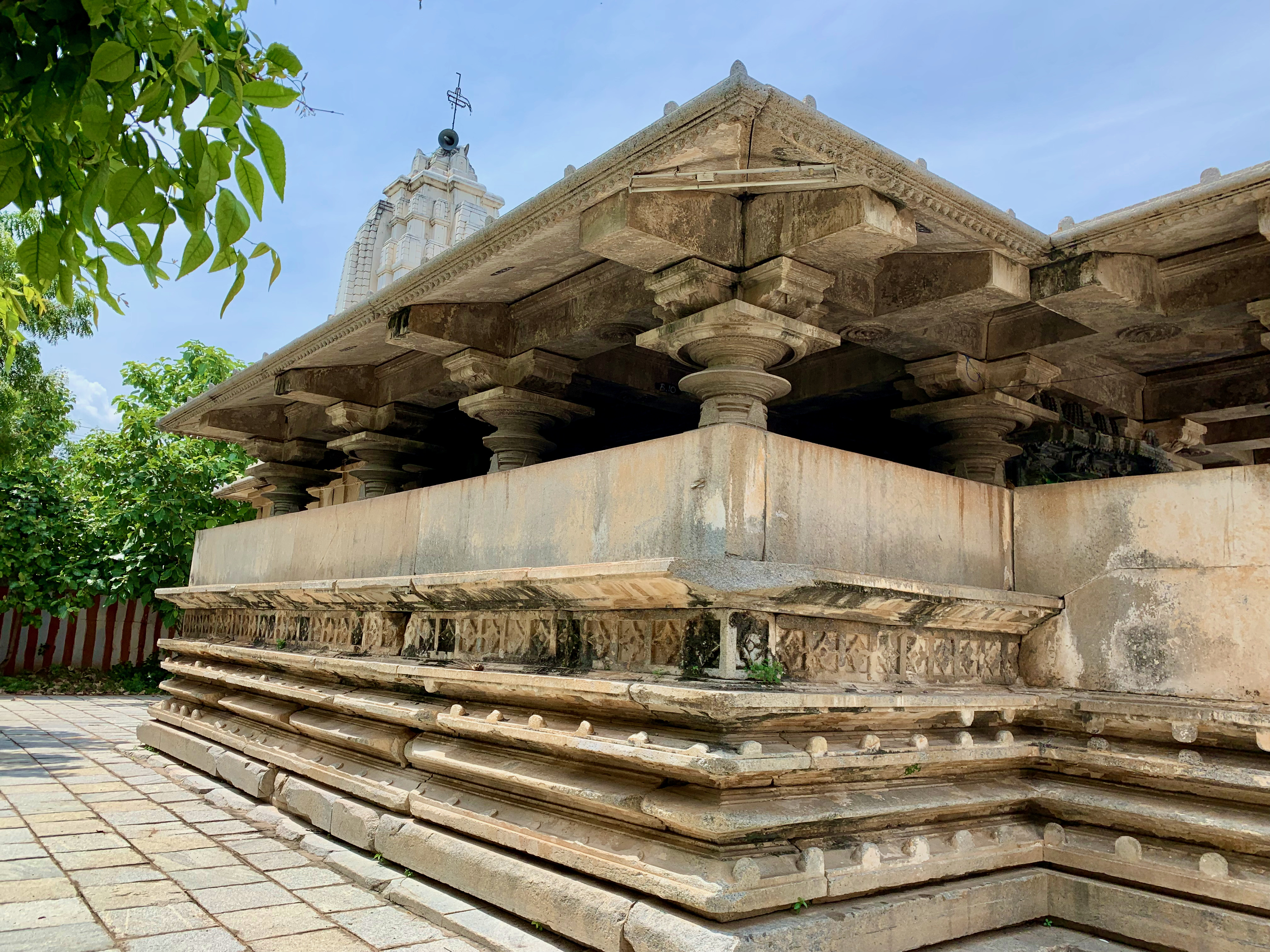
Nameshwara Temple: Built by Nami Reddi in 1202 CE of Recherla Reddis Dynasty.

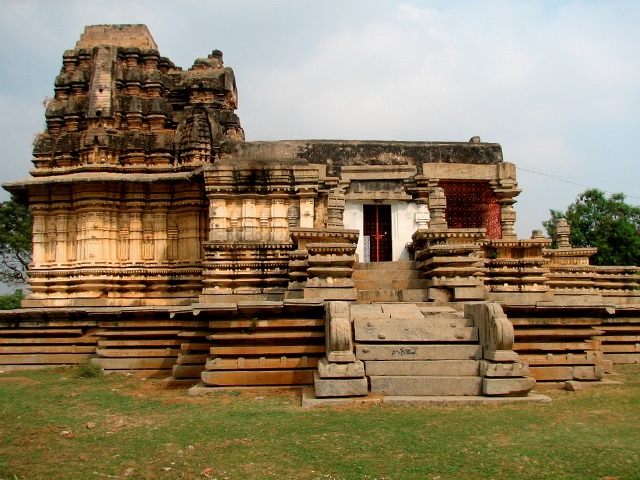
Erakeshwara Temple:Commissioned around 1208 CE by Erakasani, the wife of Bēti Reddi.

Erakeshwara Temple: Commissioned around 1208 CE by Erakasani, the wife of Bēti Reddi of the Recherla family, representing the distinct Trikuta architectural style.

== Architectural and engineering legacy ==
The Recherla Reddis are noted for several engineering innovations:

Sandbox Foundations
They used a specialized foundation technique involving sand and granite to make their temples earthquake-resistant.
Irrigation Tanks
Following the Kakatiya tradition of "Chain of Tanks" they excavated massive reservoirs, such as the Ramappa Lake, Pillalamarri Lake to foster agricultural growth in the semi-arid Deccan plateau.

The world-renowned UNESCO World Heritage Site Ramappa Temple was built by Recherla Rudra Reddy of this family.
