= Kota Vamsa =

Medieval dynasty in modern-day India

Kota Vamsa was a medieval dynasty which ruled in parts of the modern-day Indian state of Andhra Pradesh. The Kotas belonged to Dhananjaya gotra. According to V. Yashoda Devi, the Kotas are one of the four lineages—alongside the Parichchedis, Kakatiyas, and Varnatas—from whom the Kshatriyas of the Telugu country have descended. Kota chiefs ruled Kammanadu with Dharanikota as capital.

Kota Kings belonged to the Shudra varna. After they became the rulers, they came to be recognized as Kshatriyas. They had marital links with the Kakatiyas. Ganapatideva's daughter Ganapamadevi was married to the grandson of Kota Keta II.

== List of rulers ==
The Kotas consisted of a main branch with its capital at Dhanyakataka, and four collateral branches based in Yenamadala, Tripurantakam, Tadikonda, and Draksharama, respectively.

=== Kotas of Dhanyakataka ===
- Beta I (A. D. 1050-1081/91)
- Ganda (A.D. 1081/91-1108)
- Bhima I (A.D. 1108-1127)
- Beta II (A.D. 1127-1148)
- Keta I (A.D. 1148-1156)
- Bhima II (AD 1156-1182)
- Keta II (A.D. 1182-1231)
- Bhima III (A.D. 1231-1234)
- Keta III & Ganapati (co-rule) (A.D. 1234-1240)
- Ganapati (sole-rule) (A.D. 1240-1262)
- Bhima IV (A.D. 1262-1268)
- Devaraja & Mummadiraja (co-rule) (A.D. 1268)

=== Kotas of Yenamadala ===
- Rudraraja (A.D. 1216-1241)
- Betaraja & Ganapamba (co-rule) (A.D. 1241-1251)
- Ganapamadevi (female) (A.D. 1251-1264)
- Devaraju (A.D. 1264)

=== Kotas of Tadikonda ===
- Manmapota (around A.D. 1117)
- Pandambika (female) (around A.D. 1117)
- Vennaladevi (female) (around A.D. 1261)
- Prorraju & Bayyaraju (co-rule)

=== Kotas of Tripurantakam ===
- Mummadipota (around A.D. 1246)

=== Kotas of Draksharama ===
- Bhimaraja (around A.D. 1140)
- Pota (around A.D. 1140)
- Chodaraja (around A.D. 1179)
