= Senani =

Senani is both a Sanskrit title, given name, surname. It was a title denoting a military commander in ancient India. Notable people with the name include:

- Jayapa Senani, Indian military commamder
- Riham Senani (born 1993), Algerian long-distance runner
- Khaled Al-Senani (born 1989), Emirati footballer.
- Senani Hegde, Indian photographer
