= Tilavalli =

- village
- Country: India
- State: Karnataka
- District: Haveri
- Talukas: Hangal

Population (2011)
  - Total: 16,629

Languages
  - Official: Kannada
- Time zone: UTC+5:30 (IST)

Tilavalli is a village in the southern state of Karnataka, India. It is located in the Hangal taluk of Haveri district in Karnataka. Shanteshwara temple is built by a famous architecture shri jakanacharya, There are lot of monuments near to this place supports Lord Rama visit to this place.

== Demographics ==
As of 2001 India census, Tilavalli had a population of 6629 with 3378 males and 3251 females. Tilavalli is also famous for its ayurvedic medicine.

This town also contains a temple called SRI SHANTESHWARA with the ancient scriptures. This also stands as an example for Indian Architecture.

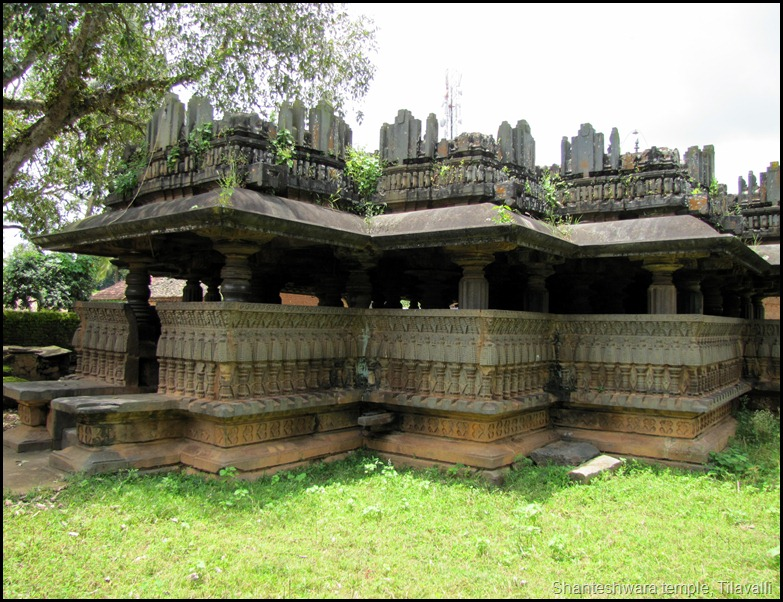
Shanteshwara Temple, tilavalli

== See also ==
- Haveri
- Districts of Karnataka
