= Nagunur Fort =

Fort in Telangana

Nagunur Fort (India)

Nagunur Fort was a fort built by the Kakatiya dynasty. It is around 8 km north of Karimnagar. The fort is testimony to the imperial powers of the Kakatiyas. It was one of the most important forts of the emerging Kakatiya dynasty and contains ruins of a cluster of Western Chalukya and Kakatiya temples. The town is named Nagunur in reference to the 400 temples that once existed here, so locals called it as Naluguvonalu and throughout many centuries it became Nagunur.

The pillars and galleries around the Shiva temple here are worth seeing. The most important temple in the complex is the Shiva temple, which has three shrines. The main entrance to the temple is on the northern side and the three shrines face the other three directions.

Panels are carved with visuals of dancers in graceful poses.

The main entrance of the temple faces North. The three shrines face the other three directions. The temple lies within the precincts of the Nagunur Fort. The fort was once the seat of power of the Kakatiyas. Its interiors which would once echo the sounds of a lively and bustling city today chants the silent agony of ruins and debris. Several other temples in decrepit state lie strewn on the Telangana State highway from Karimnagar to Rayapatnam. Buried under administrative delay, the temples, which were once the source of great activity, have today turned into a mute audience waiting for the healing touch.

== See also ==
- Kakatiyas
- Kalyani Chalukyas
