= Bhillama V =

Yadava ruler from 1175 to 1191

- Chakravartin
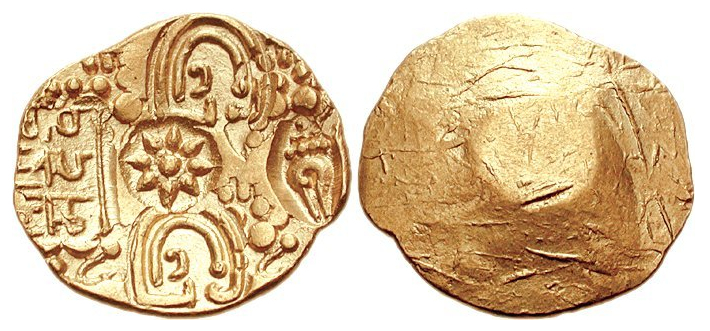
- Coinage of Yadavas of Devagiri, king Bhillama V (1185–1193). Central lotus blossom, two shri signs, elephant, conch, and "[Bhilla]/madeva" in Devanagari above arrow right

Yadava sovereign ruler
- Reign: c. 1187–1191 CE
- Successor: Jaitugi

Yadava king (Chalukya vassal)
- Reign: c. 1175-1187 CE
- Predecessor: Kaliya-Ballala
- Died: 1191
- Issue: Jaitugi
- Dynasty: Seuna (Yadava)
- Father: Karna
- Religion: Hinduism

Bhillama V (r. c. 1175–1191 CE) was the first sovereign ruler of the Seuna (Yadava) dynasty of Deccan region in India. A grandson of the Yadava king Mullagi, he carved out a principality in present-day Maharashtra by capturing forts in and around the Konkan region. Around 1175 CE, he grabbed the Yadava throne, supplanting the descendants of his uncle and an usurper. Over the next decade, he ruled as a nominal vassal of the Chalukyas of Kalyani, raiding the Gujarat Chaulukya and Paramara territories. After the fall of the Chalukya power, he declared sovereignty around 1187 CE, and fought with the Hoysala king Ballala II for control of the former Chalukya territory in present-day Karnataka. Around 1189 CE, he defeated Ballala in a battle at Soratur, but two years later, Ballala defeated him decisively.

== Rise to power ==
According to Bhillama's Gadag inscription, he was a son of Karna, and a grandson of the Yadava ruler Mallugi. The 13th century Yadava court poet Hemadri gives a different genealogy for him, but Hemadri's account may be dismissed as unreliable, since he flourished a century after Bhillama.

The Yadavas were originally vassals of the Chalukyas of Kalyani. By Mallugi's time, the Chalukya power had weakened, and Mallugi was fighting with the other Chalukya feudatories, such as the Kakatiyas. After Mallugi, his elder son Amara-gangeya and Amara-gangeya's son Amara-mallugi ruled in quick succession. Their rule was followed by Kaliya-Ballala, who was probably an usurper, and whose relation to Mallugi is unknown. Bhillama's father Karna, the younger son of Mallugi, was probably a subordinate officer or a sub-feudatory.

During the chaotic period following Mallugi's death, Bhillama created a principality for himself by capturing several forts in the Konkan and surrounding regions. First, he defeated the rulers of Srivardhana and Pratyanta-gada (modern Torna). Next, he defeated and killed the ruler of Mangalaveshtaka (modern Mangalwedha). Around 1175 CE, Bhillama grabbed power at the Yadava capital Sinnar, and ascended the throne.

== Northern raids ==
At the time of Bhillama's ascension, several conflicts were happening in southern Deccan. His nominal overlords — the Chalukyas — were busy fighting their former feudatories, such as the Hoysalas and the Kalachuris. Bhillama focused his attention towards the northern regions of Lata (southern Gujarat) and Malwa. Mularaja II, the Chaulukya king of Gujarat, was a minor. Vindhyavarman, the Paramara king of Malwa, had recently managed to restore the Paramara power by ousting the Chaulukyas from Malwa.

The 1189 CE Mutugi inscription of Bhillama boasts that he caused severe troubles to the Malavas (the Paramaras) and the Gurjaras (the Chaulukyas). This appears to be a reference to his raids in Lata and Malwa regions. His general Jahla is said to have won a battle against the Chaulukyas by introducing a mad elephant in midst of the enemy army. Bhillama's raids in Gujarat and Malwa did not result in any territorial annexations, and he was forced to retreat by the Naddula Chahamana ruler Kelhana.

The Mutugi inscription also claims that Bhillama defeated the kings of Anga, Vanga, Nepala and Panchala. However, this claim is not supported by historical evidence, and therefore, appears to be an empty poetic boast.

== Conflict with Ballala ==
Shortly after Bhillama's northern raids, his Chalukya overlord Someshvara IV faced a southern invasion from the Hoysala ruler Ballala. Ballala's attack forced Someshvara to take shelter at Banavasi, with his Kadamba feudatory Kamadeva. When Ballala's army was exhausted in this campaign, Bhillama forced Ballala to retreat, and conquered the former Chalukya capital Kalyani. This conquest probably happened around 1187 CE, when Bhillama first made his claim to an imperial status. According to the later Yadava minister Hemadri, the Hoysala ruler was killed in this battle. It is known that Ballala was not killed in this conflict, so the person mentioned by Hemadri was probably a Hoysala prince responsible for defending Kalyani. According to Hemadri, after this victorious campaign, Bhillama established the Devagiri city, which became the new Yadava capital.

After returning to his capital Dvarasamudra, Ballala reorganized his forces, and launched a fresh march to the north. By June 1189, he had conquered Banavasi and Nolambavadi, as attested by inscriptions. In response, Bhillama marched against him with 200,000-strong infantry and 12,000-strong cavalry. The two armies met at Soratur. In this battle, the Hoysalas decisively defeated Bhillama's forces. Their 1192 Anekere inscription states that Ballala manured the region from Soratur to Belvola with dead bodies of the Seuna soldiers. The Yadava general Jaitrapala (alias Jaitrasimha) fled to Lokkigundi (modern Lakkundi), but Ballala captured the fort and killed him. Ballala went on to capture the important forts of Erambara (modern Yellur), Kurrugod, Gutti (modern Gooty), and Hangal. The Yadavas were driven to the north of the Malaprabha and Krishna rivers, which formed the Yadava-Hoysala border for the next two decades.

== Death ==
During the last years of Bhillama's life, his kingdom extended from the Narmada river in the north to the Malaprabha river in the south, and included nearly all of the present-day Maharashtra (except the Shilahara-ruled Konkan) and northern parts of Karnataka. Shortly after Bhillama's defeat against Ballala in 1191 CE, his son Jaitugi succeeded him on the Yadava throne. An 1198 CE Hoysala inscription states that Ballala "moistened his sword with the blood of the Pandya king, whetted it on the grindstone of Bhillama's head, and sheathed it in the lotus mouth of Jaitugi". The two persons other than Bhillama are known to have been killed by Ballala: Kamadeva, a Pandya ruler of Ucchangi was killed in a battle against the Hoysalas; Jaitugi here refers to Bhillama's general Jaitrapala, who also died fighting the Hoysalas. This has led to speculation that Bhillama also died in a battle against Ballala.

However, the earlier 1192 CE Gadag inscriptions of Ballala do not state that Ballala killed Bhillama, although they boast that he killed Bhillama's "right hand" Jaitrasimha. It is unlikely that Ballala would have failed to boast about his killing of Bhillama, had the Yadava ruler died in a battle. Bhillama most probably died a natural death after suffering a defeat against Ballala. The claim of Ballala "whetting his sword on the grindstone of Bhima's head" appears to a poetic description by the later Hoysala poets.

== Cultural activities ==
Bhillama patronized the scholar Bhaskara, who was the teacher of Nagarjuna (the author of Yogaratnamala). An 1189-90 CE (1111 Shaka) inscription records a donation by Bhillama and others to the Vitthal Temple, Pandharpur. In this inscription, Bhillama is styled as "Chakravartin Yadava".

An 1191 CE inscription records Bhillama's donations to the Trikuteshvara Shiva temple at Gadag. An 1192 CE inscription records a grant by Ballala to the same temple, which confirms that Bhillama was defeated by Ballala.
