= Kammanadu =

Historical region in the Indian state of Andhra Pradesh

Kammanadu

Kammanadu (or Kamma-nadu, also Kamma-rashtram) is a historical region in the Indian state of Andhra Pradesh. It consisted of parts of the present day Guntur and Prakasam districts.

According to historian and geographer K. Iswara Dutt, Kammanadu consisted of the Narasaraopet, Sattenapalle, Bapatla and Ongole taluks, including the villages of the Addanki area. It was bounded by Srisailam in the west, Palnadu and Velanadu in the north, the Gundlakamma River in the south and the Bay of Bengal in the east. The erstwhile Vinukonda taluk and the Chirala taluk are also often included, which are anyway indicated by the boundary at the Gundlakamma River.

== Etymology ==
According to one theory, Kammanadu derived its name from the Gundlakamma River, which is a prominent river between the Krishna and Penna rivers in coastal Andhra. "Kamma" in this context means a stream or river. According to another theory, Kammanadu was the region between Gundlakamma and Pērakamma (the "big river", perhaps the Krishna river). However, the Tenali and Repalle taluks of the Guntur district, closer to the Krishna river, are referred to as Velanadu. They are not generally regarded as part of Kammanadu. The modern town of Guntur is likely to have been at the edge of Kammanadu.

== History ==
Between the seventh and thirteenth centuries AD, Kammanadu was ruled by a branch of the Telugu Cholas with their capital at Konidena (which is now a small village).

== Ethnicity ==
The people that emigrated from Kammanadu were referred to as belonging to a kammakula (kamma family) . Prominent among them were the general Vennaya-bhatta of the Chalukya emperor Vikramaditya V (r. 1008–1015), and generals Sarvadeva and Chamundaraya of Vikramaditya VI (r. 1076–1126). Terms such as kamma-brahmana, kamma-komati, kamma-sreshti and kamma-kapu are also attested in inscriptions as descriptions of people. The famous poet Pampa (902–941), the author of Pampa Bharata in Kannada, was referred to as a kamma-brahmana.

The prominent Kamma community of present-day is believed to be derived from the kamma-kapus, i.e., Kapus (agricultural families) of Kammanadu.

== Inscriptions ==
Various historic inscriptions referring to the region have been found. A reference to Karmarashtram appears in the inscriptions of the Ikshvaku king Madhariputra Purushadatta (3rd century A.D) found at Bethavolu (Jaggayyapeta). Later ones include the inscription of the Pallava king Kumara Vishnu II, son of Buddha Varma found in the village of Chendaluru, and one of the Eastern Chalukya king Mangi Yuvaraja (627-696 AD) written in Sanskrit.

In the inscriptions ascribed to period from the 3rd to the 11th century AD, the words Kammarashtram, Kammaratham, Kammakaratham, Karmarashtram, Karmakaratham, Karmakarashtram and Kammakarashtram were used interchangeably. The subsequent inscriptions of Telugu Chodas and Kakatiyas mentioned Kammanadu; for example, the Konidena inscription of Tribhuvana Malla from 1146.

Some of the important inscriptions relating to Kammanadu are:

- Epigraphica Indica, Vol VIII, pp. 233–236 (Chandaluru copper plate inscription of Kumara Vishnu)
- Epigraphica Indica, Vol XV, pp. 249–252 (Ongole copper plate inscription of Pallava king Vijaya Skandavarma)
- Epigraphica Indica, Vol XXIV, pp. 137–143 (Chura inscription of Vishnugopa)
- Epigraphica Indica, Vol XVIII, p. 250 (Kopparapu copper plate inscription of Pulakesi II, 7th century CE)
- Epigraphica Indica, Vol XVIII, p. 27 (Aluru inscription of Chalukya king Vikramaditya V, 1011 CE).
- South Indian Inscriptions, Volume 6, Inscriptions 124, 128, 129, 132, 139, 147, and 179.
