= Tallaproddatur =

Village in Andhra Pradesh, India

Tallaproddatur (also Thallaproddatur) is a village located in Kondapuram, Cuddapah District, Andhra Pradesh, India. As of the 2001 census, it had a population of 3,780.
