= Lekhapaddhati =

Collection of Sanskrit documents

The Lekhapaddhati (transl. Models of Written Documents), also known as Lekhapañcāśikā (English: Models of Fifty Written Documents), is a collection of Sanskrit documents written between the 8th and 15th centuries during the Chaulukya rule in Gujarat, India. It was later also composed in Prakrit and it contained rules for drafting variety of documents like documents related to land grants, treaties between the rulers and rule of administration.

== Description ==
The collection of these documents served as a repository used mainly for administrative purposes by the court officials and for private correspondence. The documents thus give some indication of the various procedures and government interactions adopted by the rulers of Gujarat. There has been an abundance of historical resources available for three and a half centuries of Chaulukya rule in Gujarat; however, this source is distinctive, as it was written as a guidebook for revenue officers and professional letter writers in the administration.

The Lekhapaddhati is an extensive glossary to many Sanskrit terms used to denote actions and practices to be undertaken by the administrators and the subjects. The document serves as a comprehensive guide to the historians studying the important role played by Gujarat in medieval India. The text provides models for conducting various activities such as economic, sociological, and administrative aspects to the subjects of the state. One set of the documents articulates various socio-economic activities, including the sale of property, the capture of slaves and duties assigned to them, and standards for trade accounting and inventory management. Similarly, another set of manuscripts deals with administrative matters, such as different types of taxes to be levied, punishment by means of confiscation of lands, and conduct of government officers, where it mentions: "no one should be harassed and troubled and no one should be spoken [harshly] anywhere". The third set of text refers to models relating to correspondence with families, teachers, lovers, and spouses, among others.

=== Lekhapaddhati as a source of information on trade and society ===
It provides us information about five department of trade in the contemporary Chaulukya empire. They are "Vyapara Karana", "Velakula Karana", "Jalapatha Karana", "Tanka Shala" and "Mandapika Karana" which corresponds to Department of trade, harbours, waterways, custom and mint. It provides further detail regarding the practice of providing sureties for loans or collateral; as it appears to have become necessary for securing loans in the contemporary period. The failure to repay dues could result in selling of the mortgaged property of the debtor.

Besides being a source of information on trade, it also provides a glimpse of society under Chaulukya rule. Accordingly, it shows the slavery to be a common feature of the society and people used to sell themselves to evade famine and hunger. It further narrates the story of a girl who wanted to sell herself to evade harassment by the invaders and the hunger. It also provides information on slave trade between India and west Asian countries. The merchant communities of the Gujarat provided charitable help to sufferers in form of food and clothes, which is well documented in the text.

== Publication history ==
Though the author of the Lekhapaddhati is unknown, the original Sanskrit documents were first collected and edited in 1925 by Chimanlal D. Dalal and Gajanan K. Shrigondekar. These scholars compiled the volume using four Sanskrit manuscripts, consisting of around 100 leaves with nine to thirteen lines per page, and dating to around the 15th century. Further, Shrigondekar observes, the work in the original documents was written in "mixed Sanskrit" during the same period.

Some commentators have labeled the language as "Jaina Sanskrit". Similarly, according to some experts, the imperfect Sanskrit used in the documents provides more information about the vocabulary of old Gujarat and the style of internal administration of contemporary rulers in Gujarat.

== Other editions ==
The guidebook was translated into English and German by Pushpa Prasad and Ingo Strauch, respectively. The translated versions provide additional details for the terms used in the original work by providing appendices indexing various individuals, places, and castes, as well as a dictionary of various vernacular terms used in the original work.
