= Pakanadu =

Historical region in the Indian state of Andhra Pradesh

Pakanadu is a region in the Indian state of Andhra Pradesh. It is spread over the undivided districts of Kadapa, Nellore and southern Prakasam. The coastal areas lying between Nellore and Krishna are also part of this region.
