= Mallampalli Somasekhara Sarma =

Indian historian (1891–1963)

Mallampalli Somasekhara Sarma (24 December 1891 – 7 January 1963) was an Indian historian, who worked at the Andhra University. He was born at Miniminchilipadu Agraharam, a village in West Godavari district of Andhra Pradesh to Bhadrayya and Nagamma. Somasekhara Sarma couldn't continue his education beyond matriculation due to poverty. He started his career as a menial employee in Kannemera Library in Madras (now called Chennai) where he could have interactions with intellectuals like Lakshmanrao Komarraju and Chilukuri Veerabhadra Rao. Then he went to Rajahmundry to work for Deshamata, published by Chilakamarthi Lakshminarasimham. He worked for Andhra Patrika magazine from 1924 to 1940. He taught research in history at Andhra University from 1940 to 1946.

== Works ==
- A Forgotten Chapter of Andhra History (History of the Musunūri Nāyaks), Andhra University, 1945.
- History of Reddi Kingdoms (circa. 1325 A.D. to circa 1448 A.D.), Andhra University, 1946.
- Āndhra Deśa Charitra Sangrahamu (in Telugu), Vishalaandhra Book House.
- Āndhrasaṃskrti taraṅgiṇī (in Telugu), Published by Andhra Pradesh Government, 1976.

The two books Forgotten Chapter and History of Reddi Kingdoms deal with the immediate aftermath of the fall of the Kakatiya Empire, the former covering the history of Musunuri Nayakas and the latter the history of Reddi kingdom. Some of his other works in Telugu include Rohiṇī Candraguptamu novel, Amarāvati Stūpamu and Āndhra Virulu skteches.

== Reception ==
Sarma is a well known Telugu historian and after his death the Government of Andhra Pradesh published a commemoration volume in his memory.

Sarma hypothesised that the Reddi kings were subordinate to the Musunuri chiefs during their inception:

The Reḍḍi kings of Koṇḍavīḍu, who began as the subordinates of the Musunūri chiefs of Rēkapalli and Waraṅgal, soon became independent, and played an important role during the revival of Hindu supremacy in the post-Kakatiya period.

The theory was criticised by historian M. Rama Rao, who noted that the founder of the Reddi line, Prolaya Vema Reddi, predated Musunuri Kapaya Nayaka. He concludes:

It is thus clear that various parts of Andhradeśa were rescued from the Muslims at various dates—Rajahmundry and the coastal region in 1324, the territory south of the Krishna in 1325 AD, the Rekapalli region in 1330 and western Andhra between 1330-35 AD. Several individuals—Prolaya Vema Reddi, Musunuri Prolaya nayaka, and Arviti Somadeva liberated these parts and they had no political connection with each other.

Modern historian Cynthia Talbot has warned against taking the inscriptional evidence at face value.

One way a warrior could assume the Kakatiya aura was through simple juxtaposition of his exploits with those of the Kakatiyas in the introductory portion of an inscription. We find this strategy employed in the Vilasa grant of Prolaya Nayaka, the Musunuri chief.

She also opined that Musunuri Kapaya Nayaka being a lord of 75 subordinates was a formulaic device.

== Legacy ==
I would not like you to go away from us without a work of appreciation from me on behalf of myself and the University for the very valuable work you have done. Your researches appear to me to possess a high scientific value as they embody the results of patience and accurate investigation and the application of sound historical methods.

— C. R. Reddy's comment on Somasekhara Sarma's early retirement.

Recognizing his valuable contribution to the field of historical research, he was invited in 1940s to join in Andhra University by Dr. Cattamanchi Ramalinga Reddy, then Vice-Chancellor of Andhra University. He discovered some copper plate grants and the Vilasa grant of Prolaya Nayaka got deciphered by him and N. Venkataramanayya. His research work on history is considered as a major contribution to Indian history by many historians. For example, his work on the Telugu history after the fall of Kakaitya empire resulted in rectification of some versions of Indian history based on Firishta and considered to be an original and greatly significant contribution.

The Mallampalli Somasekhara Sarma Historical Research Foundation was established in Visakhapatnam in honour of Sarma. It awards annual memorial awards in his name to acclaimed historians of Andhra.
