= Soratur =

Soratur Soratooru
- Village
- Location within Karnataka Location within India
- Coordinates: 15°14′51″N 75°36′42″E
- Country: India
- State: Karnataka
- District: Gadag district
- Taluk: Gadag
- Lok Sabha Constituency: Haveri

Government
  - Body: Gram panchayat

Population (2001)
  - Total: 5,349

Languages
  - Official: Kannada
- Time zone: UTC+5:30 (IST)
- ISO 3166 code: IN-KA
- Vehicle registration: KA 26
- Website: karnataka.gov.in

Soratur also spelled as Soratooru is a village in the Gadag taluk of Gadag district in the Indian state of Karnataka. It is located in the Gadag taluk of Gadag district in Karnataka.

== Demographics ==
As of 2001 India census, Soratur had a population of 5349 with 2770 males and 2579 females.

== See also ==
- Naregal
- Gajendragad
- Ron
- Gadag
- Karnataka
