= Konidena =

- village
- Interactive map of Konidena
- Location in Andhra Pradesh, India Konidena (India)
- Coordinates: 16.0156°N 80.0570°E
- Country: India
- State: Andhra Pradesh
- District: Prakasam
- Mandal: Ballikurava

Languages
  - Official: Telugu
- Time zone: UTC+5:30 (IST)
- PIN: 523301
- Nearest city: Chilakaluripet
- Vidhan Sabha constituency: Addanki

Konidena is a small village in Ballikurava mandal of Prakasam district of the state of Andhra Pradesh, India.

Between the 7th and 13th centuries, it was a regional capital of Telugu Cholas.
