= Tripuranthakam =

Tripurantakam
- Village
- Interactive map of Tripurantakam
- Location in Andhra Pradesh, India Tripurantakam (India)
- Coordinates: 16°0′2.34″N 79°27′22.77″E
- Country: India
- State: Andhra Pradesh
- District: Markapuram
- Mandal: Tripuranthakam
- Website: tripuranthakam.com

Area
  - Total: 16.37 km^{2} (6.32 sq mi)

Population (2011)
  - Total: 10,392
  - Density: 634.8/km^{2} (1,644/sq mi)

Languages
  - Official: Telugu
- Time zone: UTC+5:30 (IST)
- PIN: 523326
- Vehicle registration: AP
- Website: www.tripuranthakam.com

A bus station in Tripurantakam

Tripuranthakam is a village in Markapuram district of the Indian state of Andhra Pradesh. It is the mandal headquarters of Tripuranthakam mandal in Markapur revenue division.

According to Shiva Purana, Shiva destroyed Tripurasuras (or, demons ruling three cities) here. After his destruction of the demons and the three cities they inhabited, Shiva was given the name "Tripuranthakeswara" and the place was named "Tripuranthakam". The Sri Parvathi sahita Tripurantakeswara swamy temple is on the top of the hill and houses a secret underground passage to Srisailam from the temple premises. Below the hill inside of a pond is the Bala Thripura Sundari temple. Tripurantaka Bala Tripurasundari Devi (swayambhu) is the first incarnation of Adiparasakthi. She is believed to reside there in the form of a little girl.
