= Velanadu =

- Region of Andhra Pradesh
- Interactive map of Velanadu
- Country: India
- State: Andhra Pradesh

Languages
  - Official: Telugu
- Time zone: UTC+05:30 (IST)
- Vehicle registration: AP

Velanadu is a region in the Indian state of Andhra Pradesh. It comprises the east coastal areas of the state lying between the Krishna and Penna rivers. Tenali and Repalle mandals of present day Bapatla district and Bapatla districts are the most notable areas under this region.
