= Natavadi =

Natavadi is a region in the Indian state of Andhra Pradesh. It comprises, parts of Vijayawada and Nandigama mandals in NTR district and Madhira of Khammam district.
