= Mahadeva (Kakatiya dynasty) =

Kakatiya ruler from 1195 to 1199

Maha-deva
- Kataka-chura-kara

Kakatiya ruler
- Reign: c. 1195–1199
- Predecessor: Rudradeva
- Successor: Ganapati
- Dynasty: Kakatiya
- Father: Prola II

Mahadeva (r. c. 1195–1199) was a ruler of the Kakatiya dynasty which ruled in the present-day Telangana and Andhra Pradesh regions of India. He died in battle during an invasion of the neighbouring Seuna (Yadava) kingdom. The Yadavas captured his son Ganapati, but later reinstated him on the Kakatiya throne.

== Early life ==
Mahadeva was a son of the Kakatiya king Prola II, and a younger brother of his predecessor Rudra-deva. He had three other brothers: Harihara, Ganapati (not to be confused with his son), and Durggaraja (not to be confused with his uncle).

Rudra-deva did not have any children, and appointed Mahadeva as his successor, as attested by the Khamdavalli inscription of Prataparudra. Mahadeva succeeded him on the throne in 1195-1196 CE.

== Reign ==
Only two inscriptions from Mahadeva's reign are available: the 1197 CE Sundella (near Peddapalli) inscription and an undated, broken inscription found at the Warangal Fort. Like his predecessors, Mahadeva was a Shaivite; Dhruveshvara was his spiritual guru.

Epigraphic and literary evidence suggests that Mahadeva invaded the neighbouring Seuna (Yadava) kingdom during the reign of the Yadava king Jaitugi (r. c. 1192–1200) alias Jaitrapala. He was killed in a battle, while seated on an elephant at night, in 1198-1199 CE.

This account is also supported by the literary texts such as Pratapa-charita and Soma-deva-rajiya. The Pratapa-charita (or Pratapa-charitamu) states that Mahadeva was a brave warrior who died during an attack on the Yadava capital Devagiri, while fighting seated on an elephant.

According to the Khamdavalli and the 1249-1250 CE Yenamadala inscriptions of the Kakatiyas, while plundering the enemy's town, Mahadeva fell asleep on the two temples of a female elephant, "stained with blood as if smeared with the red sandal of the breasts of the goddess of victory in the night." When he woke, he found himself "reclining on the bosom of a celestial nymph."

According to the Patna inscription of the Yadava king Simhana II, the earlier Yadava king Jaitrapala (Jaitugi) defeated the king of Andhra. The Paithan inscription of the Yadava king Ramachandra states that Jaitrapala defeated the king of "Trikalinga" (a mistake for "Tilinga", that is, Telangana).

The Bayyaram tank inscription names Kataka-chura-kara as a title of Mahadeva, which suggests that he plundered the Kalachuri capital Kalyana (Kataka). This probably happened during his expedition to the Yadava kingdom.

== Succession ==
Mahadeva and his queen Bayyamamba had a son - Ganapati, and two daughters: Mailamba (also Mailama or Melambika) and Kundamamba.

Epigraphic evidence suggests that the Yadava king Jaitugi rescued Ganapati during the battle that resulted in Mahadeva's death, and appointed him as Mahadeva's successor. According to the Paithan inscription of Ramachandra, Jaitrapala rescued Ganapati from prison, and made him the king. The Bahal (or Bhawal) inscription of Simhana also states that a compassionate Jaitugi saved Ganapati's life in the battle, and made him the lord of the Andhra country.

Both Mailamba and Kundamamba married Rudra of Natavadi family, which held a fief in the Inugurti region since the Kalyani Chalukya rule. This Rudra was a son of Rudra, and a grandson of Mahadeva's maternal uncle Durga.
