= P. V. Parabrahma Sastry =

Telugu writer and archeologist

P. V. Parabrahma Sastry (1921–2016) was an archeologist, historian, epigraphist and numismatist who held the rank of a deputy director in the Archaeology Department of United Andhra Pradesh Government.

Sastry was born in Pedda Konduru village of Duggirala mandal in Guntur district, Andhra Pradesh in 1921.

Sastry died at the age of 96 on 27 July 2016, due to prolonged illness. He is survived by his wife, three daughters and a son.

== Achievements ==
Sastry was selected for the National Fellowship of the Indian Council of Historical Research. Sastry was one of the two persons selected for the fellowship in the year 2015. The ICHR is a premier historical research body under the HRD ministry. Dr Sastry was awarded a PhD by Karnataka University for his work on the history of the Kakatiya dynasty and early socio-economic conditions of Andhra Pradesh from 500 BC to 1000 AD. He worked with the Department of Archaeology and Museums until 1981. He conducted village-wise epigraphical surveys in the Telangana districts.

His contributions to Telugu historical research was mentioned in the pre-release events of the movie Gautamiputra Satakarani, which was based on the archaeological and historical research on the Satavahana dynasty that he conducted.

== Works ==
Sastry has written historical and archaeological works and in collaboration with other historians. His works include:

- Epigraphia Andhrica
- Rural Studies in Early Andhra in which he traced the historical origins of the Kamma caste.
- Unknown Coins
- Researches In Archaeology, History & Culture In The New Millennium - Dr. P.V. Parabrahma Sastry Felicitation Volume
- Telugu lipi, āvirbhāva vikāsālu
- Kākatīya caritra
- Kākatīya coins and measures
- Inscriptions of Andhra Pradesh : Karimnagar District
- The Kākatiyas of Warangal
- Select epigraphs of Andhra Pradesh
- Siddhōdvāha of Nr̥isiṁha
