= Subhashita =

Literary genre of Sanskrit epigrammatic poems

A subhashita (Sanskrit: सुभाषित, subhāṣita) is a literary genre of Sanskrit epigrammatic poems and their message is an aphorism, maxim, advice, fact, truth, lesson or riddle. Su in Sanskrit means good; bhashita means spoken; which together literally means well spoken or eloquent saying.

Subhashitas in Sanskrit are short memorable verses, typically in four padas (verses) but sometimes just two; but their structure follows a meter. Subhashitas are one of many forms of creative works that have survived from ancient and medieval era of India, and sometimes known as Suktis. Ancient and medieval Indian literature created tens of thousands of subhashitas covering a vast range of subjects.

These epigrammatic verses and their anthologies are also referred to as Subhashitavali or Subhashitani.

== Philosophy ==
Subhashitas are known for their inherent moral and ethical advice, instructions in worldly wisdom and guidance in making righteous deeds. Subhashitas create an appeal as the inherent message is conveyed through poems which quote practical examples which are often rhythmic in nature. Some authors even relate Subhashitas to sugar coated bitter medicines considering their worthiness.

The subhashita deals with various subjects and includes topics of day to day experiences that every one can easily relate to. A subhashita is always eloquent in form, structured in a poetical form, complete in itself and concisely depicts a single emotion, idea, dharma, truth or situation.

Subhashitas are drawn from real life and give fruit of philosophy grafted on the stem of experience!

— Ludwik Sternbach

== Structure ==
Subhashitas are structured in pada-s (Sanskrit: पद, or lines) in which a thought or a truth is condensed. These epigrammatic verses typically have four padas (verse, quatrain), are poetic and set in a meter. Many are composed in the metrical unit called Anuṣṭubh of Sanskrit poetry, making them easy to remember and melodic when recited. But sometimes Subhashitas with two pada-s or even one pada proclaim a truth.

According to Mohana Bhāradvāja, Subhashita in Indian Literature is a single verse or single stanza, descriptive or didactic but complete in itself expressing a single idea, devotional, ethical or erotic in a witty or epigrammatic way. Author Ludwik Sternbach describes that such wise sayings in poetic form not only contain beautiful thoughts but they also make the expressions in cultivated language. He further says that such form of Indian literature had a tinge of poetry, the poetical skill being exhibited in the intricate play of words which created a slight wit, humour, satire and sententious precepts; they arose laughter, scorn, compass and other moods. The poetic style of narration found in Subhashita is also termed as muktaka (independent), as the meaning or the mood of which is complete in itself. This poetic form has been compared to Persian rubai or Japanese tanka by some authors.

== Sources ==
The authors of most Subhashita are unknown. This form of Indian epigrammatic poetry had a wide following, were created, memorized and transmitted by word of mouth.

The works of many ancient Indian scholars like Bhartṛhari (5th century CE), Chanakya (3rd century BC), Kalidasa (5th century AD), Bhavabhuti (8th century AD), Bhallata (10th century AD), Somadeva Bhatta (11th century AD), Kshemendra (11th century AD), Kalhana (12th century AD) are considered to be treasures of many valuable subhashitas. The famous Panchatantra (3rd century BC) and Hitopadesha (12th century AD) which is a collection of animal fables effectively use subhashitas to express the inherent moral wisdom of their stories. The Vedas and ancient scriptures like Bhagavad Gita, Puranas, Ramayana, and Mahabharata are also major sources of Subhashitas.

=== Dedicated works ===
There are also various individual works such as Subhashita Sudhanidhi by Sayana of the 14th century and Samayochita padyamalika which are dedicated works of wisdom literature consisting of various subhashitas. The Subhashita Sudhanidhi, as Dr. K Krishnamoorthy writes in his critical edition, also serves as a source-material to reconstruct the early Vijayanagara kingdom.

=== Collection of verses (Subhashita Sangraha) ===
From the beginning of the 10th century AD several writers contributed immensely in collecting and preserving different wise sayings of contemporary and earlier poets. Author Vishnulok Bihari Srivastava opines that such subhashita sangrahas (collection of verses) have done a great service by preserving several rare subhashitas which would have otherwise been lost. A few such literary works are listed below.

Sl No	Work	Compiled by	Time Line	Contents
1	Gaha Sattasai	Hala	2nd-6th century	Gāthā Saptaśatī, 7 chapters of 100 verses each, mostly about love, emotions, relationships
2	Upadesha sahasri	Adishankaracharya		
3	Subhashita-ratna-kosha	Vidyakara	12th century	Buddhist scholar whose work compiled verses of poets who flourished before 12th century. It includes many excerpts from Amaru and Bhartṛhari
4	Subhashitavali	Vallabhadeva of Kashmir	Around 15th century	Collection of 3527 Verses of 360 poets
5	Saduktikarnaamritam	Shridaradasa	1205	Consists of 2380 verses of 485 poets mainly from Bengal
6	Suktimuktavali	Jalhana	13th century	Jalhana was a minister of the Seuna (Yadava) king Krishna
7	Sarangdhara paddhati	Sarangadhara	1363 AD	Comprises 4689 verses
8	Padyavali	Anonymous	-	386 Verses of 125 poets
9	Sukti ratnakara	Suryakalingaraya	14th century	2327 verses on ethics and morality, in four parvans divided in paddhatis, primarily dealing with dharma, artha, karma and moksha.
10	Padyaveni	Venidatta	-	Works of 144 poets
11	Subhashitaneevi	Vedanta Deshika	15th century	From South India
12	Subhasita muktavali	Anonymous	Late 16th century	32 muktamanis, 624 verses, both ethical and descriptive
13	Padyarachana	Lakshmana Bhatta	Early 17th century	756 Verses
14	Padya amruta tarangini	Haribhaskara	Later 17th century	-
15	Suktisaundarya	Sundaradeva	Later 17th century	-

Other anthologies of subhashita verses from unknown and known authors, estimated from early 1st millennium AD, are Jayavallabha's Vajjalagga and Chapannaya's Gahao. However these verses are in regional Prakrit languages of India, derived from Sanskrit.

Subhashita Manjari, verse 1.5, explains the importance of Subhashita with a subhashita:

पृथिव्यां त्रीणि रत्नानि जलमन्नं सुभभाषितम्।
मूढैः पाषाणखंडेषु रत्न संज्ञा विधीयते॥

Translation:

On this earth, there are three jewels - water, food and subhashita.
But the fool calls pieces of stone, jewel.

Other illustrations of Subhashita are:

परोपकाराय फलन्ति वृक्षाः परोपकाराय वहन्ति नद्यः

परोपकाराय दुहन्ति गावः परोपकाराय शरीरम् एतत्

— Subhashita Samgraha
Translation:

For benevolence, tree bears fruit
For benevolence, river flows with water
For benevolence, cow gives milk
For benevolence, a spirit is with human body

Garments are cleaned by water,
the mind by truth,
the soul by ahimsa,
the intellect by knowledge.

— Subhashita Srisuktavali

Pure connection may convince a lover's heart,
that ampler blessings flow when we're apart,
when she is here, my lady is but one,
when she's away, in all things I see her alone.

— Subhashita-miktavali

There are tens of thousands of Subhashita in Indian literature covering topics as diverse as humor, sarcasm, criticism, politics, eroticism, emotions, love, wealth, daily life, society, learning, stages of life, ethics, morals, spirituality, deities, medicine, food, festivals, prayer, riddles, science, mathematics, poetry, language, art, Vedas, Upanishads, Puranas, Itihasas, and other subjects.

== Related terms ==
Lokokti (or lokavakya, pracinavakya) are Sanskrit proverbs, in the form of short sentences that express truths or facts, but they differ from Subhashitas in not being in poetical form. An example of a Sanskrit lokokti is:

Heartless words get heartless answers.

— Laukikanyayanjali

A sutra is another ancient Indian literary form. Sutras are concise wisdom or truth, but typically they too are not poetical. Unlike subhashitas and lokokti whose authors are unknown or long forgotten, sutras are attributed to sages, famous or known personalities. Sutras typically need to be read within a context to be completely understood. An example of a Sanskrit Sutra attributed to Chanakya is:

Punishment must be proportionate to the offense.

— Chanakya-sutrani

== Translations ==
Many Subhashitas in Sanskrit have been translated into other regional languages of India.
