= Hemadpanti architecture =

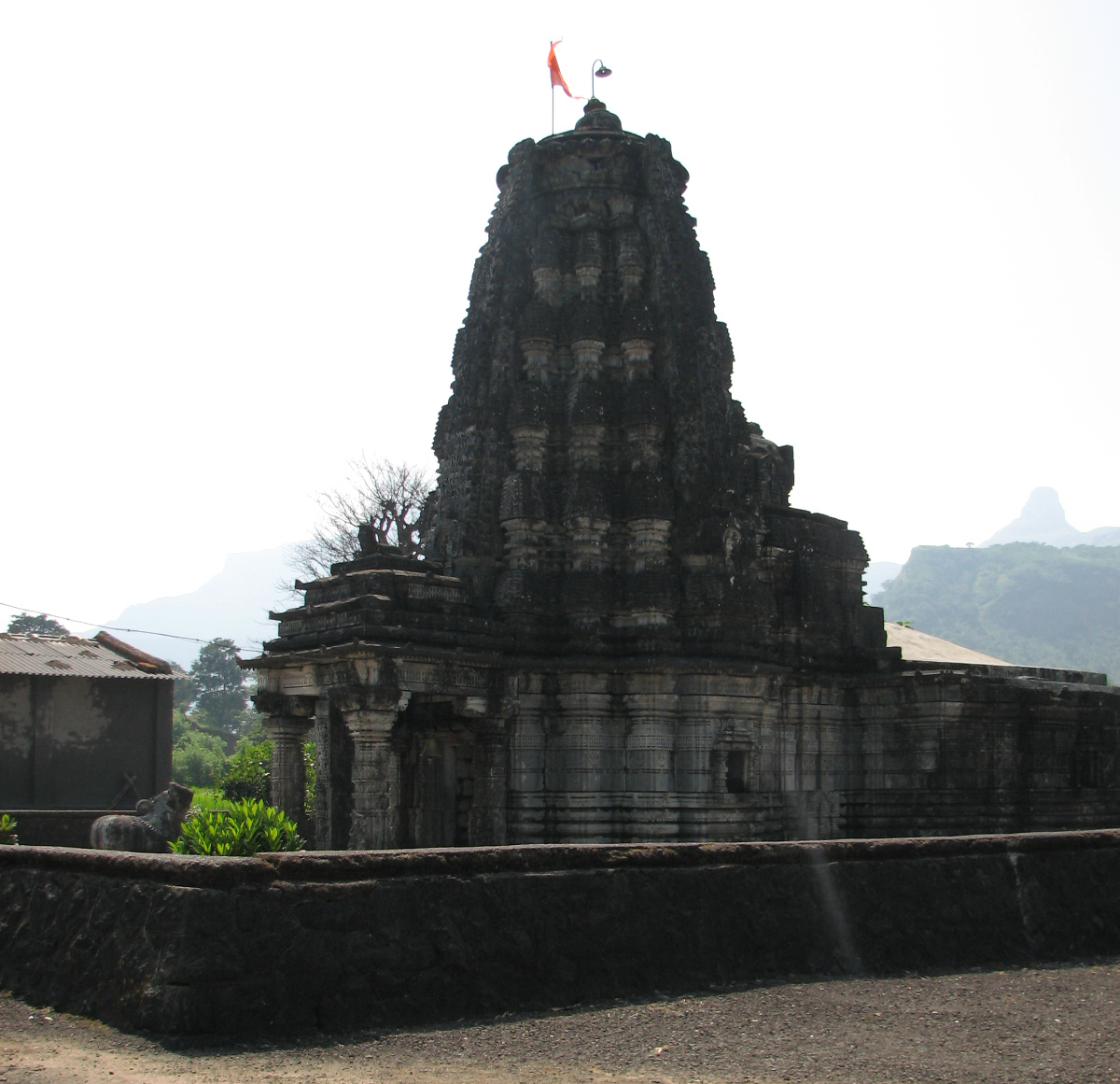
- Amruteshwar temple, Ratangad-an example of Hemadpanti style stone construction

History
- Built: 13th century

Site notes
- Area: Deccan region, India

Hemadpanti architecture (also spelled Hemadpanthi) is an architectural style that originated in the 13th century in the Deccan region of India, under the patronage of the Seuna (Yadava) dynasty. Named after Hemadri Pandit (also known as Hemadpant), who was the prime minister of the Mahādeva and Ramachandra of the Seuna (Yadava) dynasty, which ruled the western and southern part of India. The style is characterized by its use of dry masonry construction, relying on locally sourced black basalt and lime, rather than mortar. This construction technique, involving the precise interlocking of stones through tenon and mortise joints, provided both durability and seismic resistance.

Hemadpanti architecture blends elements from earlier Chalukyan traditions, with local cultural and geographical adaptations. Notable features of this style include star-shaped ground plans, intricate stone carvings, and serrated facades that create patterns of light and shadow. The design also incorporates layered ceiling structures, often with a central lotus motif symbolizing purity and renewal, particularly in temples. Some noteworthy buildings include the temples in Pandharpur, Aundha Nagnath, and the Vijapur city walls, the Gondeshwar Temple at Sinnar Maharastra and the Daitya Sudan temple (Lunar).

== Definition ==
Emerging in India (present-day Maharashtra) between the 13th and 14th centuries, the Hemadpanthi style represents a distinctive architectural tradition. This concept was first introduced by Hemadri Pandit, a scholar and administrative official during the Yadava dynasty. A defining feature of this style is the use of dry masonry construction, which relies exclusively on locally sourced black stone and lime, omitting any binding agents. Instead, the structural integrity is achieved through precise interlocking techniques involving mortise and tenon joints.

A structure can be identified as Hemadpanthi if it employs this construction method and draws design inspiration from the Purmyka style of Chalukyan temples. Notable examples of this architectural tradition include the Aundha Nagnath Temple and the Amruteshwar Temple, both of which exemplify the application of Hemadpanthi techniques.

== History ==
=== Origin ===
The Hemadpanthi architectural style originated during the Yadava dynasty (1175–1317 CE) and flourished across the Deccan region of India. As a vassal state of the Chalukya dynasty, the Yadavas were deeply influenced by its architectural traditions. The Chalukyas were renowned for their grand and intricately decorated monumental structures, such as the Virupaksha Temple, which exemplifies the fusion of royal symbolism with religious devotion. However, while Chalukyan temples were primarily dedicated to Hindu deities and Jain spiritual leaders, this created an opportunity for the Yadavas, who were devoted to Shaivism, to develop a distinct architectural identity. Religion has historically played an important role in India, these places of worship have served as sites for both religious practices and the transmission of spiritual traditions. To safeguard the continuity of their faith, worshippers gradually developed the idea of establishing permanent sacred spaces. In 1187, the Yadava dynasty formally declared independence, freeing itself from Chalukyan rule.

Following their independence, Yadava rulers actively sought to establish a distinct architectural style that would reinforce the symbolic significance of their political and religious authority. Their architects took inspiration from Chalukyan temples in the Malwa and Gujarat regions, adapting the designs innovatively to suit local cultural contexts and geographical conditions. For example, the relief was still existing, but the building area became smaller than that of Chalukyan temples. New small and medium-sized temples were built in many areas. Finally, Minister Hemadri (also known as Hemapant) is credited with combining these elements to form what became known as the Hemadpanthi architectural style.

=== Development ===
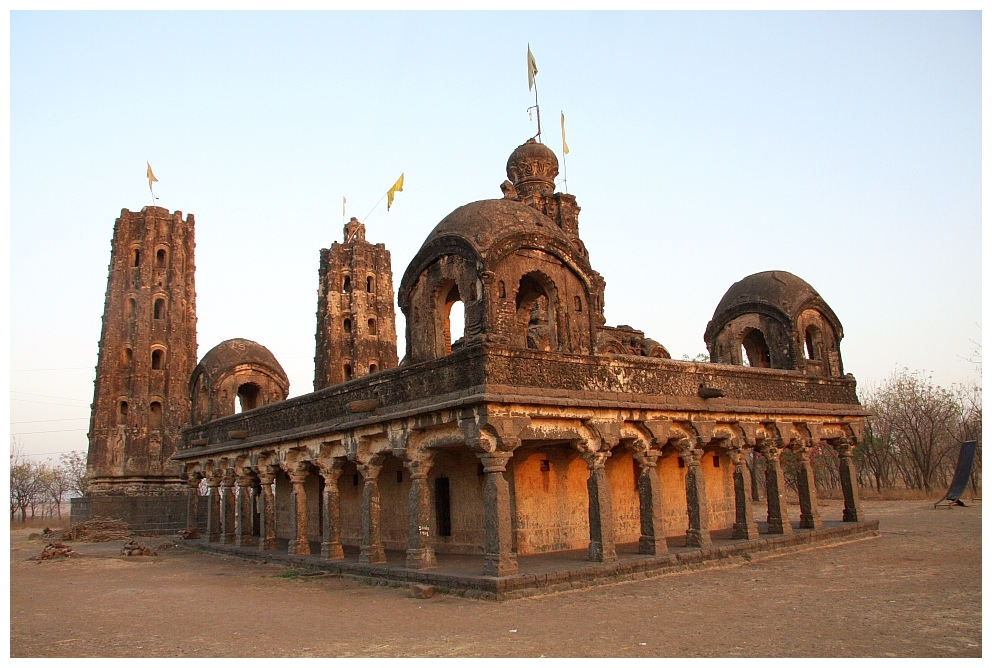
Khandoba Mandir, Beed Example of Hemadpant Architecture.

From the 13th to the early 14th century, when the Yadava dynasty was at its zenith, there was remarkable growth in Hemadpanthi architecture. The rulers in this period actively patronized and funded the development of temples. Stone masonry made buildings more economical and also enhanced their structural strength and earthquake resistance, contributing to its widespread adoption.

The popularity of Hemadpanthi architecture also stemmed from the fact that it was a masterful blending of Chalukyan Bhumija elements with the aesthetic conventions of the time, achieving a harmonious balance between the art of the past and the needs of the present. Characterized by painstakingly designed gateways and star-shaped ground plans, with serrated facades that create patterns of light and shadow, especially in temple architecture, these buildings were not only places of worship but also custodians of the Yadavas' distinctive artistic and architectural genius. These qualities caused Hemadpanthi architecture to be widely used in numerous locations, securing its status as a significant architectural expression of the Yadava era.

=== Decline ===
The Yadava dynasty was taken over by the Delhi Sultanate in the 14th century, and there were significant political changes. The war stopped the construction of temples, and most of the Hemadpanti temples were destroyed by invading armies. To avoid making the temples conspicuous and to minimize the risk of further destruction, the builders modified the architecture of the surviving temples, limiting the external decorations as much as possible.

By 1307, the Yadavas had totally disappeared from the region. New rulers arrived and brought about the adoption of Indo Islamic architectural styles. They placed limitations on the construction of Hindu temples. With a decrease in official support, Hemadpanthi architecture began to fade in influence over time. The number of craftsmen skilled in this construction technique was also decreasing, posing challenges for its sustainability. Luckily, Hemadpanthis architectural methods and structural advancements have been maintained in existing monuments continuing to impact subsequent architectural approaches and academic studies.

== Characteristics ==
=== Dry Masonry Technique ===
A defining characteristic of Hemadpanthi architecture is its dry masonry method. Craftsmen worked with the basalt produced locally to meticulously shape each block and stack them without using mortar or contemporary bonding materials. Skilled artisans honed their craft through repeated practice. They made close ties between adjacent stones that not even a thin postcard can be inserted between them. And these buildings all had the ability to endure years of exposure to the elements and maintain stability. It showed that craftsman's deep knowledge of material characteristics and local weather conditions, representing a notable aspect of India's architectural history.

=== Material Selection ===
Hemadpanthi structures primarily use sourced black basalt and lime for their construction materials.The strength and durability of basalt make it ideal for the climatic and geological conditions of the Deccan region. Lime is also a good material to improve the bonding between stones in the absence of adhesives. These specific building materials ultimately endowed the building with a unique texture and vein.

=== Layout ===
The Hemadpanthi style Hindu temples in Maharashtra from the 12th century showcase external and spatial arrangements with star shaped or polygonal layouts, on their facades accompanied by sawtooth patterns that play with light and shadow effectively. The sanctum (Garbhagriha) of a Hemadpanti temple typically adopts a square layout. Connected to it is the main hall (Sabhamandapa), supported by several finely carved stone columns. These pillars, along with their capitals, are often embellished with reliefs that narrate mythological episodes, reflecting a high level of artistic skill. In some examples, arches are incorporated into the main hall's architecture to improve structural stability and spatial openness. On the southern side, a separate worship space (Bhogamandapa) is often included for ceremonies and celebratory gatherings. The temple’s exterior frequently features zigzagging walls composed of alternating convex and concave profiles, adding a sense of rhythm and depth to the facade. Most Hemadpanti temples face east, with the entrance oriented toward the rising sun.

=== Decorative Content ===
The interior decoration of the building pays great attention to the expression of religious totems and mythological stories. Their inner sanctum generally enshrines major Hindu deities such as Shiva, Vishnu, or the goddess Lakshmi, with this being particularly common in temples dedicated to Shiva. Surrounding walls are often carved with miniature sculptures of divine figures or guardian deities, arranged in niches according to traditional Hindu temple layout principles. These elements serve both devotional and decorative functions, enhancing the spiritual atmosphere while also offering visual richness. The elaborate design of the temples highlight the significance given to religious symbols and mythological stories. This design showcases the ruling elites focus on religious faith and creativity, representing the connection between political power and religion.

=== Ceiling Design ===
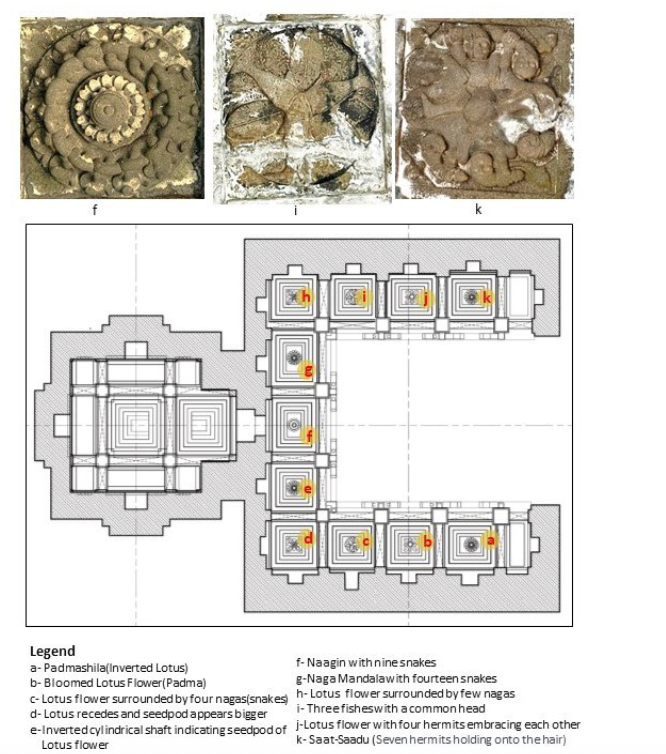
Iconography in the ceiling of colonnaded space, Krishnabai Temple

One unique feature of Hemadpanthi temple architecture is the layered ceiling design seen in shrines and pavilions. There is an arrangement with three distinct sections, in the ceiling. An outer square area, a central rhombus shape and a middle circular part adorned with lotus patterns. The square and rhombus portions were composed of many independent carving components. This approach highlights stone carving craftsmanship and enhances the structural integrity of the ceiling. The main circular portion is typically crafted from a sizable stone and features the lotus motif—a symbol of purity and renewal in Indian culture—adding a profound religious significance to the design. Overview, this design spatial layout presents a visual flow from the periphery towards the middle, enhancing the artistic quality of the structure..

=== Cultural Expression ===
The Hemadpanti temple functioned not only as a site for worship but also as a hub for cultural continuity and community life. It carried the dual responsibility of transmitting cultural values and hosting public rituals. This dual role is embodied in the temple’s architectural detailing, from the refined execution of its statuary to the thematic variety of its carvings. Relief panels depict local legends, emotional expressions, seasonal rituals, and daily life, ensuring the preservation of intangible cultural heritage in tangible form. The artistic choices and narrative styles reflect a conscious effort to go beyond local norms, incorporating elements from other regions. Visual traditions from Maharashtra merge seamlessly with influences from South India and beyond, revealing a pattern of cross-regional artistic interaction. This cultural interplay illustrates the inclusive and adaptive nature of Indian temple art, which balances regional identity with broader artistic dialogues.

== Case Study ==
=== Markanda Temple complex ===
Temples built in the Hemadpanti style are rarely isolated structures. They often appear in groups, forming visually striking clusters or even small-scale temple towns. In certain cases, multiple Hemadpanti temples were constructed together in previously uninhabited areas, resulting in expansive and unified temple complexes.

The Markanda Temple complex, located on the left bank of the Wainganga River, is famous for its Hemandpanthi-style Shiva temple architecture. Architects speculate that the temples were built between the 10th and 11th centuries. At the time of its construction, the Markanda Temple Complex comprised a total of 24 temples, covering an area of 196 x 168 square feet. The interior of the temple is carved with a large number of exquisite reliefs, totaling more than 400. Sculptures include human figures, geese and monkeys, and about half of the sculptures depict various figures of Shiva and Parvati. The main hall of the temple is supported by four ornate columns, and above the temple stands a tall spire. These elements showed that the overall architectural style was very elegant, historian A. C. Ningham once described it as "the most picturesque temple complex".

But as time went by, many temples were broken or even in ruins. The main temple was struck by lightning about 260 years ago, destroying the spire and the roof of the hall. Although it was later restored at the expense of a Gond nobility, the temple could no longer be restored to original state. Until today, only 18 temples remain, and only four are in good condition. In honour of its unique architectural and cultural value, the Archaeological Survey of India has listed this place as an architectural heritage of the Vidabad region.

=== Mankeshwar Temple ===
The Nashik area is often regarded as the birthplace of the Yadava people, where a large number of Hemadpanti style temples have been built, one of the most exquisite temples is the Mankeshwar Temple. This temple was built in the 12th century on Jhatumbya hill near Malegaon. Stones of the temple are taken from the south side of the mountain, reflecting the characteristics of local materials. The exterior of the building is decorated with spectacular sculptures depicting hunting scenes, dancers, Rambha, Tilottama and Urvashi. One of the palaces inside the temple, sabha bhavan, stands on twelve huge columns, and there are many statues of dancers on the rotunda. The ceiling of the palace, antarala, is carved with a turtle, and the gates are carved with other beasts, hagins, and goddesses such as Gandava. The entrance to garbha griha is carved with a statue of the Elephant-headed god. Another palace, Bhogamandap, had two halls with Windows, which was relatively rare in architecture at the time. With these setting details, the palace can obtain good lighting and ventilation conditions, and large gatherings are sometimes held there. The interior and exterior of the Mankeshwar Temple are the result of careful design, showing the exquisite craftsmanship of the craftsmen of the time. In particular, the sculptures carved on the building are rare sights in the world.

== Current State of Preservation ==
Hemadpanti temples are more than just architectural artifacts—they represent a vital part of Maharashtra's cultural identity and India’s broader religious and artistic heritage. These structures exemplify the technical mastery of ancient craftsmen and the depth of spiritual conviction that guided their creation. However, many of these temples are now in alarming states of neglect due to long-term disrepair and the absence of structured conservation. Some are surrounded by modern housing, others repurposed for secular use, and several suffer from structural damage that places them at risk of collapse.

According to a 2012 Times of India report, ruins of a 13th-century Hemadpanti-style temple were uncovered in Roha village, Bhandara district, during the “Vainganga Shodh Yatra,” a collaborative expedition by researchers from the Gomukh Trust in Pune, the Bhandara Natural and Cultural Research Council, and the Vidarbha Water Resources Organization. The team discovered statues near a Hanuman temple on the village’s outskirts, including depictions of Shiva and Parvati (Uma-Maheshwar), Ganesh, a serpent deity, and headless figures presumed to be additional Ganesh idols. Other finds included stone fragments such as Amalak rings—typically placed atop temple spires—and further sculptural remnants. These findings strongly suggest the historical presence of a significant Hemadpanti temple at the site.

Archaeologist Dr. Manohar Naranje has confirmed the temple dates back to the 13th century, when the area was populated by affluent families who commissioned many grand temples. However, like many others, this site has fallen into ruin. Without coordinated conservation efforts, these structures face the risk of being lost or forgotten. Proactive maintenance and restoration are critical to ensure these temples endure as tangible witnesses to India’s layered cultural and religious history.
