= Dridhaprahara =

1st ruler of Seuna (Yadava) dynasty
- Reign: c. 860-880
- Successor: Seunachandra I
- Dynasty: Seuna (Yadava)
- Father: Vajrakumara or Subahu
- Religion: Jainism

Dridhaprahara (IAST: Dṛḍhaprahāra, r. c. 860-880) is the earliest historically attested ruler of the Seuna (Yadava) dynasty that ruled the western Deccan region in present-day India.

== Early life ==
According to Jain tradition, Dridhaprahara was a son of king Vajrakumara of Dvaraka. When his mother was pregnant with him, a great fire destroyed the city. Jain saint Jainaprabhasuri saved his mother, he was born sometime after the destruction of Dvaraka. Dridhaprahara was a devotee of the eighth Jain tirthankara Chandraprabha.

Dridhaprahara is one of the earliest historically attested ruler of the Seuna (Yadava) dynasty grew under the care of 8th Tirthankara Chadraprabhu Swami also named his capital Chandraditypura after him.

No historical evidence connects Dridhaprahara or his dynasty to Dvaraka: after rising to prominence, the dynasty started claiming descent from the legendary hero Yadu, whose descendants (called the Yadavas) are associated with Dvaraka. The dynasty's claim of connection with that city may simply be a result of their claim of descent from Yadu rather than their actual geographic origin.

== Rise to power ==
The Nasikkya-pura-kalpa section of Jinaprabha-suri's Vividha-tirtha-kalpa provides following account of Dridhaprahara's rise to power: Once, cattle thieves raided his town, and stole the people's cows. Dridhaprahara single-handedly fought the thieves and retrieved the cows. The local Brahmins and other honoured him with the title Talarapaya ("the protector of the village").

Historian A. S. Altekar theorizes that Dridhaprahara was a warrior living around 860, when Gurjara-Rashtrakuta wars would have brought instability to the Khandesh region. He probably protected the region against enemy raids, because of which people started paying him taxes, and his family rose to prominence.

== Legacy ==
Dridhaprahara is the earliest historically attested ruler of his dynasty, and finds a mention in the Vasai (Bassein) and Asvi inscriptions. He is said to have established the city of Chandradityapura (modern Chandor).

His son and successor was Seunachandra, who was probably a Rashtrakuta feudatory, and after whom the dynasty came to be known as Seuṇa-vaṃśa.
