= Someshvara (Shilahara dynasty) =

Shilahara king
- Reign: 1255–1265
- Predecessor: Ananta Deva III

Someshvara was Shilahara ruler of north Konkan branch from 1255 CE – 1265 CE.

The successor of Keshideva II was Someshvara, who, like Aparaditya, assumed the imperial titles Maharajadhiraja and Konkana Chakravarti.

Someshvara is the last known king of North Konkan. In his time the power of the Yadavas of Devagiri was increasing. The Yadava king Krishna (1247 CE - 1261 CE) sent an army under his general Malla to invade North Konkan. Though Malla claims to have defeated the Shilahara king, the campaign did not result in any territorial gain for the Yadavas. Mahadeva, the brother and successor of Krishna, continued the hostilities and invaded Konkan with a large troop of war-elephants. Someshvara was defeated on land and betook himself to the sea. He was pursued by Mahadeva. In the naval engagement that followed, Someshvara was drowned. Referring to this incident Hemadri says thatSomeshvara preferred to drown himself and face the submarine fire rather than the fire of Mahadeva's anger. The scene of this fight is sculptured on some Virgal stones found near Borivali station in Bombay. Some of the stones show the land battle in which the elephants took part, while others depict the lines of vessels propelled by oars, both in advance upon the enemy and in the melee itself. Since Mahadeva's force was strong in elephants and the stone from the sculptures upon it appears to belong to the 12th or 13th century CE, it is quite possible as Cousens has suggested, that these stones may be commemorating the heroes who fell in the battle between Someshvara and Mahadeva. The battle may have taken place in 1265 CE. Thereafter the Yadavas appointed a governor named Achyuta Nayaka to rule over North Konkan. His Thane plates are dated in 1272 CE. Thereafter, we get several inscriptions of the Yadavas from North Konkan. (Dept. Gazetteer: 2002)

== See also ==
- Shilahara
