= Ammana =

Yadava king in 1270

Yadava king
- Reign: c. 1270 CE
- Predecessor: Mahadeva
- Successor: Ramachandra
- Dynasty: Seuna (Yadava)
- Father: Mahadeva
- Religion: Shaivism

Ammana (IAST: Ammaṇa, r. c. 1270 CE) was a ruler of the Seuna (Yadava) dynasty of Deccan region in India. He succeeded his father Mahadeva, and remained on the throne for a few months, before being overthrown by his cousin Ramachandra.

== Ascension ==
Ammana was a son and the successor of the Yadava king Mahadeva. Mahadeva had ascended the throne around 1261, after the death of his elder brother Krishna, probably because Krishna's son Ramachandra was a minor at the time. When Mahadeva died around 1270, Ammana became the new king, but Ramachandra contested his claim to the throne. The general public and important officers of the Yadava kingdom probably saw Ramachandra as the rightful heir. This is evident from the fact that courtiers Hemadri and Tikkama, who had been loyal to Mahadeva, supported Ramachandra instead of Ammana.

The Purushottamapuri copper-plate inscription of Ramachandra refers to some military achievements of Ammana, but given the short duration of Ammana's reign, this description can be ignored as historically unreliable.

== Overthrow ==
Ammana was a pleasure-loving man, who was fond of dance and music. Ramachandra overthrew him sometime in the second half of 1271 CE. According to an inscription of Ramachandra, he and his followers entered the Devagiri fort disguised as actors, and arranged a performance before Ammana. During the performance, they suddenly unmasked themselves, and seized Ammana and his supporters.

This veracity of account is also supported by literary texts such as Bhanuvilasa (a Mahanubhava text) and Nagadeva-Charita of Parashurama-Vyasa. According to the Mahanubhava texts, Ramachandra blinded Ammana. Parashurama Vyasa's Nagadeva-Charita states that Ramachandra killed Ammana, and that Ramachandra's ultimate defeat against the Muslims was a result of this sin. The veracity of this claim is doubtful, since the other texts only mention the blinding, not the killing. Ammana may have died a natural death in prison.
