= Krishna of Devagiri =

Yadava king from 1246 to 1261

Krishna

Yadava king
- Reign: c. November/December 1246 – August 1261
- Predecessor: Simhana
- Successor: Mahadeva
- Issue: Ramachandra
- Dynasty: Seuna (Yadava)
- Father: Jaitugi II (son of Simhana)

Krishna (IAST: Kṛṣṇa; r. c. 1246–1261 CE), also known as Kanha or Kannara, was a ruler of the Seuna (Yadava) dynasty of Deccan region in India. He successfully invaded the Paramara kingdom of Malwa, and fought inconclusive wars against the Vaghelas and the Hoysalas. The Yadava inscriptions also credit him or his generals with several other victories, but veracity of these claims is doubtful.

== Early life ==
Krishna was a grandson of the Yadava king Simhana, and succeeded Simhana presumably because his father Jaitugi II died before Simhana. An inscription dated 2 November 1248 was issued during the second year of Krishna's reign, and an inscription dated 25 December 1248 was issued during the third year of his reign. This suggests that Krishna ascended the throne in November or December 1246.

== Wars ==
Krishna maintained the territory that he had inherited from his grandfather. The Yadava inscriptions credit him with several conquests. For example, the Munoli inscription describes him thus:

...endowed with all power, the great lord of Dvaravatipura, a Trinetra to the Madana-like Malava, the terrifier of Gurjara-raja, one who caused the Konkana-raja to tumble, the thruster out of the Hoysala-raja, the restorer of the Telunga-raya...

=== Paramaras ===
The Paramara dynasty ruled the Malwa kingdom located to the north of the Yadava kingdom. By the time of Krishna's ascension, the Paramara power and prestige had declined because of invasions from the Iltutmish-led Delhi Sultanate. Krishna took advantage of this situation, and invaded Malwa sometime during the reign of the Paramara king Jaitugideva. The invasion must have happened in or before 1250, when the Yadava records first mention it.

The Munoli inscription compares Krishna to Shiva (trinetra) and the Paramara king to the Madana (in Hindu mythology, Shiva incinerates Madana). The Mamadapur inscription also alludes to Krishna's victory over the Paramara king. The invasion does not seem to have resulted in any territorial annexation.

=== Vaghelas ===
Krishna also attempted an invasion of the Vaghela-ruled Gujarat (Gurjara) region. The Vaghela king Visala-deva had married a Hoysala princess: both these kingdoms were traditional rivals of the Yadavas, and the marriage may have provided additional provocation for Krishna's invasion.

The conflict was probably limited to a few frontier skirmishes, which variously resulted in advantage for the Yadavas and the Vagehlas, and did not result in any significant territorial changes. Both Yadava and Vaghela records claim victory in this inconclusive conflict. The Yadavas' Paithan inscription and a eulogy by their court-poet Hemadri claim that Krishna destroyed the forces of Visala-deva. On the other hand, the Vaghelas' Dabhoi inscription claims that Visala-deva defeated Krishna.

=== Hoysalas ===
Krishna's general Chamunda claims to have "humbled the pride" of the Hoysala king Someshvara sometime before 1250. According to historian A. S. Altekar, this may be a reference to the Yadava success in a frontier skirmish. Historian T. V. Mahalingam theorizes that the Yadava forces were able to capture a part of the Hoysala territory, as attested by the discovery of Krishna's inscriptions in the present-day Chitradurga district. The Hoysala records claim victory for Someshvara.

=== Pandyans ===
Krishna's general Bichana, who was the viceroy of the southern part of Yadava kingdom, claims to have defeated the Pandyans sometime before 1253. Historian T. V. Mahalingam believes this to be conventional claim without any historical basis. According to historian A. S. Altekar, there may be some truth to this claim: the Pandyan king Jatavarman Sundara had invaded the Kakatiya kingdom, advancing as far as Nellore. It is possible that the Kakatiya king Ganapati, who ruled as a Yadava feudatory for several years, requested Krishna's help against the Pandya invasion, and Krishna dispatched Bichana to help him.

=== Cholas ===
The Munoli inscription of Krishna's general Chamunda states that Krishna defeated the Cholas, but this appears to be an exaggeration.

=== Kalachuris ===
The Munoli inscription states that Krishna captured the Kalachuri capital Tripuri. The Kalachuri kingdom had ceased to exist by the mid-13th century, and their former territory had practically turned into a no-man's land. it is possible that Krishna or one of his generals occupied Tripuri for a while.

== Last days ==
Krishna's last inscription is dated May 1261. His son Ramachandra was probably not born or was not old enough to hold the title of yuvaraja (heir apparent) at the time of his ascension, or to ascend the throne at the time of his death. Krishna's brother Mahadeva, who was designated the heir apparent since at least 1250 and assisted the king in the administration, succeeded him in 1261. Mahadeva was succeeded by his son Ammana, but Ramachandra forcefully dethroned him and became the new king in 1271.

== Administration ==
Simhana's generals and officers, such as Bichana and his elder brother Mallisetti, continued to serve Krishna. Mallisetti, who was a district officer under Simhana, rose to the rank of sarva-deshadhikari (viceroy) early in Krishna's reign. His son Chamunda-raya held the titles maha-pradhana and maha-matya since around 1250.

Lakshmideva, a Gujarati Brahmin, was another important minister of Krishna, and claims to have helped consolidate the king's rule. His son Jalhana was a counsellor as well as a leader of the elephant force, and claims to have won several battles for Krishna. Jalhana also compiled or commissioned the compilation of the Sanskrit anthology Sukti-muktavali. His sons Ramachandra and Keshava held fiefs in present-day Satara district, and continued to serve the Yadavas after their father's death.

== Religion ==
Krishna followed Vedic Hinduism, and one of his inscriptions describes him as Vedoddhara ("upholder of the Vedas"). 13th century Yadava court scholar Hemadri credits him with performing several ritual sacrifices and rejuvenating the weakened dharma. The Mahanubhava text Lila-charita states that Krishna had high regard for the Mahanubhava saints, he visited the sect's founder Chakradhara at Lonar.

== Cultural activities ==
The literary works composed during Krishna's reign include:

- Sukti-muktavali, a Sanskrit anthology containing selections of writings from celebrated poets: it was compiled or commissioned by Krishna's minister Jalhana
- Vedanta-kalpataru, Amalananda's commentary on Vachaspati-mishra's Bhamati
