= Ramachandra of Devagiri =

Yadava ruler from 1271 to 1311

Ramachandra
- Maharajadhiraja; Rayanarayana
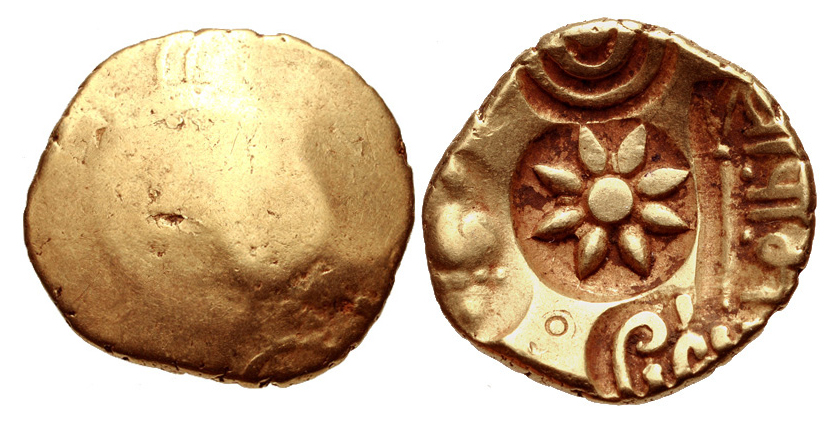
- Gold Gadyana of Ramachandra (1270–1311), central lotus blossom, two śri, conch, and "śri rama" in Devanagari above standard left, each in incuse.

King of Devagiri
- Reign: c. 1271 – c. 1311 CE
- Predecessor: Ammana
- Successor: Simhana III
- Issue: Simhana III; Jhatyapali; Ballala; Bhima
- Dynasty: Seuna (Yadava)
- Father: Krishna
- Religion: Vaishnavism

Ramachandra (IAST: Rāmacandra, r. c. 1271-1311 CE), also known as Ramadeva, was a ruler of the Seuna (Yadava) dynasty of Deccan region in India. He seized the throne from his cousin Ammana, after staging a coup in the capital Devagiri. He expanded the Yadava realm by fighting his neighbours such as the Paramaras, the Vaghelas, the Hoysalas, and the Kakatiyas.

In 1296 CE, he faced a Muslim invasion from the Delhi Sultanate and was forced to pay an annual tribute to Alauddin Khalji. After he discontinued the tribute payments in 1303-1304 CE, Alauddin sent an army led by his slave-general Malik Kafur to subjugate him around 1308, forcing the Yadavas to become a vassal of the Delhi Sultanate. Subsequently, Ramachandra served Alauddin as a loyal feudatory, and helped his forces defeat the Kakatiyas and the Hoysalas.

== Early life ==
Ramachandra was a son of the Yadava monarch Krishna. At the time of Krishna's death around 1260 CE, Ramachandra was probably very young, because of which his uncle (Krishna's younger brother) Mahadeva ascended the throne. When Mahadeva's son Ammana became the next monarch around 1270 CE, Ramachandra also made a claim to the throne. Most of the important officers and generals probably saw Ramachandra as the rightful heir. This is evident from the fact that courtiers Hemadri and Tikkama, who had been loyal to Mahadeva, deserted Ammana and started supporting Ramachandra.

== Coup against Ammana ==
Sometime in the second half of 1271 CE, Ramachandra seized the throne from his cousin Ammana. An inscription of Ramachandra gives the following account of this coup: Ramachandra and his followers entered the Devagiri fort, disguising themselves as actors. During a performance before the entertainment-loving Ammana, they suddenly seized the monarch and his supporters.

This account is also supported by literary texts such as Bhanuvilasa (a Mahanubhava text) and Nagadeva-Charita of Parashurama-Vyasa. According to the Mahanubhava texts, Ramachandra blinded Ammana. Nagadeva-Charita states that Ramachandra killed Ammana, and that Ramachandra's ultimate defeat against the Muslims was a result of this sin. The veracity of this claim is doubtful, since the other texts only mention the blinding, not the killing.

== Conflicts with neighbours ==
Ramachandra's capital Devagiri and the capitals of his rivals

=== Paramaras ===
The Paramara kingdom of Malwa was located to the north of the Yadava kingdom. By the 1270s, the Paramara power had weakened considerably, and their kingdom had been divided between the king Arjunavarman II and his minister. Taking advantage of this situation, Ramachandra invaded the Paramara kingdom in the 1270s, and easily defeated the Paramara army.

Ramachandra's 1271 CE Paithan inscription alludes to his conquest of Malwa, and his 1276 CE Udari inscription describes him as "a lion in destroying the multitude of the rutting elephants of Arjuna". The Malwa invasion may have been a way to mark his ascension to the throne.

=== Vaghelas ===
During the northern campaign against the Paramaras, Ramachandra also appears to have been involved in skirmishes against his north-western neighbours, the Vaghelas of Gurjara. Inscriptions of both the dynasties claim victories, so this conflict appears to have ended inconclusively. The Thane copper-plate inscription of Ramachandra states that the Yadavas won the war, while the Cintra copper-plate inscription of Sarangadeva claims that the Vaghelas emerged victorious in this conflict.

=== Hoysalas ===
During the reign of Ramachandra's uncle Mahadeva, the Yadavas had suffered a defeat against their southern neighbours, the Hoysalas. To avenge this defeat, Ramachandra decided to send a powerful expedition against the Hoysalas. He spent 2–3 years preparing for this expedition. The expedition was led by experienced generals such as Saluva Tikkama, Joyideva, Irungola Chola of Nirgunda, and Harapala (a son-in-law of Ramachandra). Their force was supported by another force led by the general Kannaradeva and the ministers Chaundarasa and Vanadaevarasa.

The Yadava force led by Tikkama invaded the Hoysala territory in the autumn of 1275. When Tikkama encamped at Belavadi near the Hoysala capital Dvarasamudra, the Hoysala king Narasimha III send a force led by Anka and Maideva to counter him. Tikkama defeated this Hoysala force in January 1276.

Meanwhile, the Yadava force led by Kannaradeva attacked Doravadi in the Hoysala territory. The Yadavas won the battle, but their minister Vanadevarasa was killed by the Hoysala chief Singeya Nayaka.

Tikkama subsequently besieged the Hoysala capital Dvarasamudra. Over the next few months, the Hoysala generals such as Nanjeya and Gullaya were killed defending their capital against the invaders. On 25 April 1276, the Hoysala commander-in-chief's son Ankeya Nayaka led a decisive attack against the Yadavas, and forced Tikkama to retreat to Dhummi.

Although he was unable to conquer the Hoysala capital, Tikkama managed to gather a large plunder from this invasion, including a large number of elephants and horses. There were some minor skirmishes between the two kingdoms over the next few years, but there was no major conflict. The Hoysala king Narasimha remained occupied in a family feud against his brother Ramanatha, while Ramachandra was busy in campaigns against other rivals.

=== Kakatiyas ===
Ramachandra's uncle Mahadeva had suffered a setback against their eastern neighbours, the Kakatiyas. Instead of launching a direct attack against the Kakatiyas, Ramachandra appears to have supported the chiefs who were unhappy with the Kakatiya queen Rudrama. The Kakatiya queen retaliated to these political maneuvers, resulting in the conquest of some Yadava territories by the Kakatiya general Vitthala-deva-nayaka. This general built new fortifications at Raichur in the former Yadava territory in 1294.

=== Northeastern campaign ===
The Purushottamapuri inscription of Ramachandra suggests that he expanded the Yadava dominion at its north-east frontier. First, he subjugated the rulers of Vajrakara (probably modern Vairagad) and Bhandagara (modern Bhandara).

The inscription suggests that he next marched to the defunct Kalachuri kingdom, and occupied the former Kalachuri capital Tripuri (modern Tewar near Jabalpur). Using Tripuri as his base, he marched to the Hindu holy city of Kashi (Varanasi), which had been captured by the Delhi Sultanate from the Gahadavalas in the preceding decades. The inscription states that he built a temple dedicated to the god Sharangadhara (Vishnu) in Kashi. According to historian A. S. Altekar, this suggests that Ramachandra occupied Varanasi for at least 2–3 years. This may have happened during 1286–1290, when the Delhi Sultanate had been weakened following the death of Ghiyas ud din Balban and before the ascension of Jalaluddin Khalji. On the other hand, historian P. M. Joshi claims that accounts made in the inscription are "totally hollow".

The Purushottamapuri inscription further claims that after Kashi, Ramachandra marched to Kanyakubja and Kailasha mountain. However, there is no other historical evidence of such conquests. These claims appear to be a result of poetic alliteration (Kashi - Kanyakubja - Kailasha), and are not based on actual historical incidents.

Meanwhile, Ramachandra's feudatories at Khed and Sangameshwar in Konkan rebelled against him. Ramachandra's son crushed this revolt.

== Reduction to vassal status ==
Ramachandra seems to have faced invasions by the Turko-Persian Muslims (called "mlechchhas" or "Turukas") since the 1270s. A 1278 inscription of the monarch calls him a "Great Boar (Varaha) in securing the earth from the oppression of the Turks"; a similar claim is made in some subsequent inscriptions as well. P. M. Joshi says that even after becoming a vassal of the Delhi Sultanate, Ramachandra claimed (or allowed his officials to claim) great victories over the Turukas. Therefore, Joshi dismisses the "great boar" claim as a boastful one, theorizing that at best, Ramachandra may have "chastised some Muslim officials" in the coastal region between Goa and Chaul. The Yadavas were certainly aware of the danger of Muslim invasion by 1291, when Rukmini-Svayamvara by the Yadava court poet Narendra mentions "the prowess and ruthlessness" of the mlechchhas.

In 1296, Alauddin Khalji, the governor of the Kara province of Delhi Sultanate, raided Devagiri. At the time of Alauddin's invasion, a major part of the Yadava army was away from the capital, under the crown prince Simhana. Ramachandra was not adequately prepared for a defence, and agreed to a peace treaty, promising Alauddin a large tribute. However, before the treaty could be realized, Simhana returned to the capital with the Yadava army. Alauddin defeated him, and imposed a much heavier tribute on Ramachandra.

The Yadavas lost their prestige as a result of Alauddin's invasion. Taking advantage of the weakened Yadava power, the Kakatiya ruler Prataparudra annexed the eastern part of Ramachandra's kingdom, which included the present-day Anantapur and Raichur districts. The Hoysala ruler Ballala III and his general Gangeya Sahani recaptured the territories that the Hoysalas had lost to the Yadavas in the preceding years, including the town of Banavasi.

Alauddin Khalji usurped the throne of Delhi from his uncle Jalaluddin Khalji in 1296, shortly after his successful raid against the Yadavas. Ramachandra stopped sending tributes to Alauddin after 1303–1304. According to the 14th-century Muslim chronicler Isami, Ramachandra secretly informed Alauddin that he did not want to rebel against the Sultanate, and that the rebel Yadava faction was being controlled by his son. In 1308, Alauddin Khalji sent a force led by his slave-general Malik Kafur to subjugate Ramachandra. Malik Kafur's army conclusively defeated the Yadava army led by the crown-prince, and took Ramachandra to Delhi. In Delhi, Alauddin treated Ramachandra with courtesy, and reinstated him as a vassal in Devagiri. Alauddin bestowed upon him the title Raja-i-Rajan ("king of kings"), and also gave him Navsari as a personal jagir.

According to Isami, Ramachandra also gave his daughter Jhatyapali in marriage to Alauddin. This daughter is alternatively called Chhitai, Jhitai, Jethapali or Kshetrapali in various historical texts. Isami states that she was the mother of Alauddin's son and successor Shihab-ud-din Omar. The 14th century Persian historian Wassaf, in his Tajziyat al-amsar, also mentions that the ruler of Devagiri gave his daughter to Alauddin to save his life. The 16th-century historian Firishta claims that after Alauddin's death, his viceroy Malik Kafur married Ramachandra's daughter. Chhitai Varta (c. 1440), a Hindi poem by Narayan-das, narrates her legend.

Ramachandra remained loyal to Alauddin until his death, and helped Malik Kafur defeat the Kakatiyas (1309) and the Hoysalas (1311). When the Sultanate forces halted at Devagiri during their invasion of the Kakatiya capital Warangal, Ramachandra put his kingdom's facilities at their disposal. During the Sultanate's invasion of the Hoysala capital Dvarasamudra, Ramachandra supported them with supplies during their halt at Devagiri. He also ordered his general Purushottama to guide the Sultanate forces to the Hoysala frontiers.

== Successors ==
Ramachandra appears to have died sometime in 1311, although the exact date of his death is not certain. The Nala inscription, his last extant inscription, is dated 1311 CE (1233 Shaka). He was succeeded by his son Simhana III (also Shankaradeva or Singhana), who was defeated and killed after unsuccessfully rebelling against Alauddin Khalji.

Ramachandra had two other sons: Ballala and Bhima (also called Bimba). Of these, Bhima escaped to Konkan, where he established a base at Mahikavati (modern Mahim in Mumbai).

== Religion ==
The Yadava records call Ramachandra a great devotee of Shiva (maha-maheshvara), and state that he anointed eight icons of the god "with the milk of his fame". These records also compare him to Vishnu and his various avatars; for example, he is called "Narayana among kings" (raya-narayana). An inscription compares him to the god Rama, and states that he liberated the holy city of Varanasi from the mlechchhas (foreigners), and built a golden temple of Sharngadhara (Vishnu) there.

Hemadpant, a minister of Ramachandra and his father, is credited with building five temples at Ramtek, which were dedicated to Rama-Sita, Lakshmana-svami, Hanuman, goddess Ekadashi, and Lakshmi-Narayana. An inscription discovered at the Lakshmanasvami temple suggests that Ramachandra empowered his viceroy to promote the Rama worship at Ramtek.

The land grants issued by Ramachandra declare that the "dam of dharma" is common to all kings, and urge all future kings to abide by this "dam".
