= Suktimuktavali =

Anthology of Sanskrit-language verses (1257 CE)

Suktimuktavali (IAST: Sūktimuktāvalī, 1257 CE) is an anthology of Sanskrit-language verses composed during the rule of the Seuna (Yadava), a medieval Indian dynasty. It was either authored or commissioned by the Yadava general Jalhana.

== Date and authorship ==
One of the concluding verses of the text mentions that it was composed in the year 1179 of the Shaka Era, which corresponds to the year 1257 of the Common Era.

The authorship of the text is not clear. One of its introductory verses name its author as Jalhana (IAST: Jalhaṇa), the commander of the elephant force of the Yadava ruler Krishna. The introductory portion of the text provides following account of Jalhana's family: Dada, a man of the Vatsa gotra, served the Yadava chief Mailugi (Mallugi). He led Mallugi's elephant force against the Kalachuri ruler Vijjana. Dada had four sons - Mahidhara, Jahla, Samba and Gangadhara - who contributed to the growth of the Yadava power. Mahidhara succeeded his father as the commander of the Yadava elephant force, and also fought against Vijjana. He was succeeded by his brother Jahla, who participated in several Yadava campaigns, and came to be known as "Bhagadatta" (the name of a legendary hero mentioned in the Mahabharata). Jahla was succeeded by Gangadhara's son Janardana, who taught the art of managing elephants to the Yadava prince Simhana. Janardana's son and successor Lakshmideva helped consolidate the power of the Yadava king Krishna, built a large tank, and maintained a beautiful garden. Jalhana was the son and successor of Lakshmideva.

However, the concluding verses state that Bhanu (or Bhaskara) composed the work on behalf of "Jalha" (presumably an abbreviated form of the name "Jalhana"). The text does not clarify how the two men were related. Embar Krishnamacharya, who produced a critical edition of the text in 1938, theorized that Bhanu authored the text, which was commissioned by his master Jalhana.
