= Mahadeva of Devagiri =

Seuna emperor from 1261 to 1270

Mahadeva
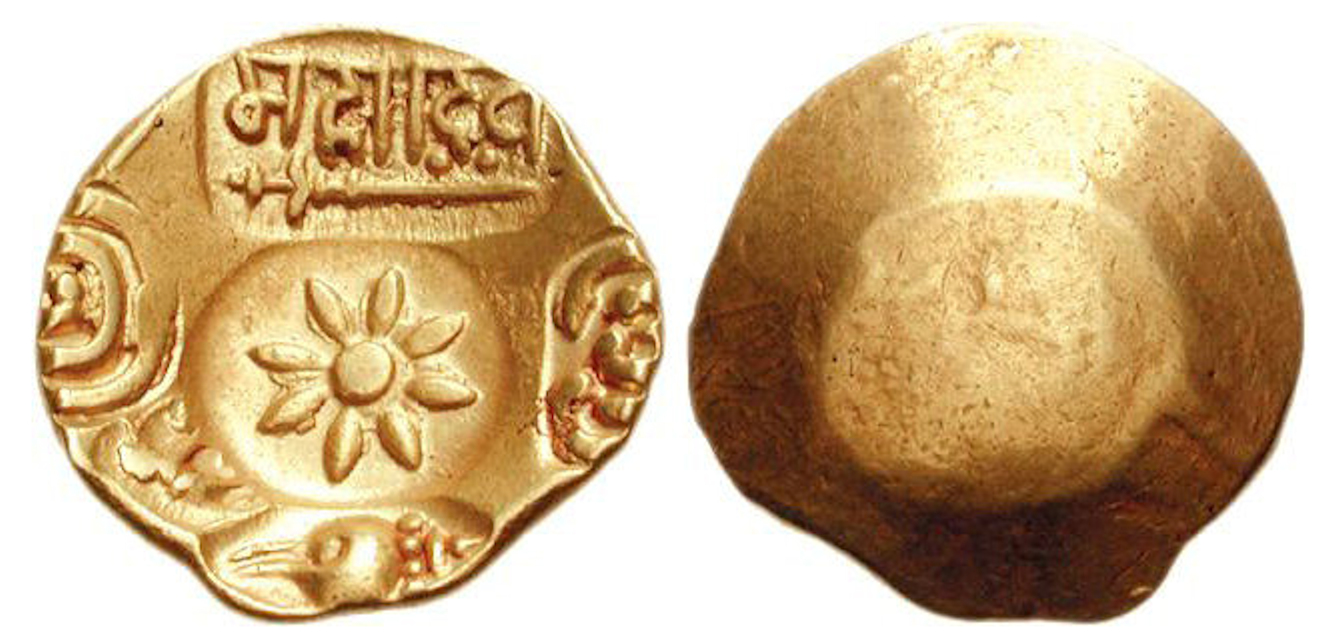
- Yadavas of Devagiri, coinage of king Mahadeva (1261-1270). Central lotus blossom, two sri, elephant, conch, and “Mahadeva” in Devanagari above sword right punchmarks.

Yadava king
- Reign: c. 21 August 1261 – c. May/June 1270
- Coronation: c. 21 August 1261
- Predecessor: Krishna
- Successor: Ammana
- Sarvadhikarin: Tapparasa; Hemadri
- Spouse: Vaijayi
- Issue: Ammana
- Dynasty: Seuna (Yadava)
- Father: Jaitugi II (son of Simhana)

Mahadeva (IAST: Mahā-deva, r. c. 1261-1270 CE) was a ruler of the Seuna (Yadava) dynasty of Deccan region in India. He succeeded his brother Krishna on the throne.

Mahadeva defeated the Shilaharas of Kolhapur, and suppressed a rebellion by his Kadamba feudatories. He invaded the neighbouring kingdoms, but was forced to retreat by the Kakatiya queen Rudrama and the Hoysala king Narasimha II. The Yadava records also credit him with other military successes, but these claims may be exaggerated.

== Early life ==
Mahadeva was a younger brother of his predecessor Krishna. Their father Jaitugi II seems to have died before their grandfather Simhana, because of which Krishna succeeded Simhana.

Mahadeva assisted his brother in the administration, as attested by an inscription as well as the text Vedanta-kalpataru. During Krishna's reign, Mahadeva was designated as the heir apparent (yuvaraja) since at least 1250, probably because Krishna's son Ramachandra had not been born, or was not old enough to hold the title of yuvaraja at the time of his ascension. At the time of Krishna's death, Ramachandra seems to have been a minor, and therefore, Mahadeva became the new king.

The last inscription from Krishna's reign is dated May 1261. The first record from Mahadeva's reign is a copper-plate inscription dated 21 August 1261, which records a grant made on the occasion of his coronation. Mahadeva must have ascended the throne sometime in August 1261, if not on 21 August.

== Wars ==
=== Shilaharas of Thane ===
Mahadeva's grandfather Simhana had subjugated the Shilaharas of Kolhapur around 1215. The kings of another Shilahara branch continued to rule as Yadava feudatories with their capital at Thane. However, these Shilahara rulers occasionally fought with the Yadavas to assert their independence, and such a conflict took place early in Mahadeva's reign.

According to the Yadava court poet Hemadri, Mahadeva sent an army including a strong elephant force against the Shilahara ruler Someshvara. After being defeated on the land, Someshvara boarded his ships, but Mahadeva's navy pursued him, and Someshvara drowned in the sea. Hemadri states that Someshvara preferred drowning to capture, because he believed that "the fire burning under the ocean would be less oppressive than the wrath of Mahadeva".

It is not clear if Mahadeva's conquest put an end to the Shilahara branch of Thane, and resulted in the annexation of their territory to the Yadava kingdom. A fragmentary 1266 inscription names Maharajadhiraja Konkana-chakravarti Jaitugi-deva as the ruler of Konkan, and lists Mainayaka and Chandra-prabhu among his ministers. These two ministers also ` Someshvara, and the title Konkana-chakravarti was used by the Shilhara titles. According to one theory, Jaitugi was a son or relative of Someshvara, and had managed to re-establish the Shlihara power. However, the name Jaitugi was borne by earlier members of the Yadava dynasty. This, coupled with the title Maharajadhiraja, suggests that Jaitugi may have been a Yadava prince who governed the annexed territory with assistance of the former Shilahara ministers.

=== Kakatiyas ===
The Kakatiya kingdom, located to the east of the Yadava kingdom, suffered from chaos after the death of the Kakatiya king Ganapati in 1261-1262. Queen Rudrama, the successor of Ganapati, faced rebellions from feudatories. Taking advantage of this situation, Mahadeva invaded the Kakatiya kingdom.

According to the Yadava court poet Hemadri, the Yadava army defeated the Kakatiya forces, and captured several elephants. Hemadri also states that Mahadeva advanced up to the Kakatiya capital, but did not conquer it because his enemy was a woman. The veracity of this claim is doubtful. Other records suggest that the Kakatiyas repulsed the Yadava invasion. The Pratapa-charita states that Rudrama's forces defeated Mahadeva's army, and pursued it till the Yadava capital Devagiri. A fragmentary Kannada language inscription also states that the Kakatiya general Bhairava defeated the Yadava army, which may be a reference to his repulsion of Mahadeva's invasion. A coin of Mahadeva bears the Kakatiya emblem varaha with the Yadava symbols; this varaha may have been stuck on Mahadeva's coins to mark the Kakatiya victory.

=== Hoysalas ===
By the 1260s, the southern Hoysala kingdom had been divided into two parts, and its northern part was ruled by Narasimha II. Around 1266, Mahadeva invaded Narasimha's kingdom, and the existence of Yadava inscriptions in the Hoysala territory (such as the Chitradurga district) indicate Yadava influence there. The invasion was ultimately unsuccessful, and Mahadeva was forced to retreat. Two Hoysala inscriptions state that Mahadeva underestimated Narasimha's power, and entered the battlefield on his elephant in grandiose style; however, he was defeated and fled away on his horse at night.

=== Kadambas ===
The Kadamba feudatories of the Yadavas rebelled against Mahadeva, probably encouraged by his defeat against the Hoysalas. Mahadeva's general Balige-deva suppressed the rebellion in c. 1268.

=== Vaghelas ===
The Paithan inscription of the Yadavas states that Mahadeva defeated the northern Vaghela king Visala-deva. Mahadeva ascended the throne in 1261, and Visala died in 1262. Therefore, either Mahadeva defeated Visala immediately after his ascension, or this may a reference to a military campaign conducted during Krishna's reign, in which Mahadeva participated as the heir apparent.

=== Other campaigns ===
According to the Harihara inscription, fearing Mahadeva, the Gaudas "entered anthills", and the Utkalas "losing shame, fled away". These achievements of Mahadeva seem to be purely imaginary. Hemadri claims that Mahadeva's northern neighbours - the Malavas - made a boy their king, because they knew that Mahadeva would not attack a minor. However, the real reason for Mahadeva not attacking their kingdom was probably his preoccupation with campaigns against his southern neighbours.

== Administration ==
Mahadeva's prime minister (Sarvadhikarin) was Maharaja Tapparasa, who held this post until 1275. His other officers and subordinates included:

- Hemadri, a noted author and builder, held the position of Shri-karanadhipa in Mahadeva's court; he was the superintendent of the secretariat and the elephant corps; he composed Vrata-khanda during Mahadeva's reign
- Chatta-raja and Kucha-raja, Brahmin brothers who administered the Nolambavadi (area around modern Shimoga) from their headquarters at Belur, Karnataka
- Deva-raja, an officer in the southern provinces
- Mai-deva, a feudatory who administered the Kolhapur region

Mahadeva's queen Vaijayi is credited with building the Vaijanatha temple at Paithan.

== Last days ==
The last known date of Mahadeva is May–June 1270; he died soon after. He was succeeded by his son Ammana, but his nephew Ramachandra forcefully dethroned Ammana and became the new king in 1271.
