= Hemadpant =

Prime Minister of the Seuna dynasty from 1259 to 1274

Mahapradhan of the Seuna dynasty
- In office 1259–1274
- Monarchs: Mahadeva; Ammana; Ramachandra
- Succeeded by: Keshavpant

Personal details
- Died: 1309
- Relations: Kamadeo (father)
- Occupation: Mahapradhan

Military service
- Allegiance: Seuna (Yadava) dynasty
- Years of service: 1259–1309
- Rank: Peshwa
- Unit: Seuna cavalry
- Battles/wars: Third Seuna Civil War

Hemādri Paṇḍita, popularly known as Hemāḍapanta, was a polymath and a prime minister from 1259 to 1274 during the reign of Mahādeva (r. 1261–1270) and Ramachandra (r. 1271–1311) of the Seuna (Yadava) dynasty, which ruled the western and southern part of India. Hemadpant is also the creator of Hemadpanti architecture.

== Origin ==
Hemadri Pandit was born in a Deshastha Brahmin family in Paithan that had its origin in the Karnataka. His father, Kāmadeo, had brought him up in Maharashtra. Hemadri's biography written by Keshav Appa Padhye, the author has mentioned that Hemadri was a Rigvedi Vatsagotri (belonging to the Vatsa Gotra), Panchapravari (5 pravara) brāhmaṇa (५: जामदग्ना वत्सास्तेषां पञ्चार्षेयो भार्गवच्यावनाप्नवानौर्वजामदग्नेति, ref. आश्वलायनश्रौतसूत्र). He has mentioned the reference for this information to be the book authored by Hemadri himself, the चतुर्वर्गचिंतामणि, or chaturvarga-chintāmaṇi.

== Career ==
Hemadri was a diplomat, an administrator, an architect, a poet, and a theologian and scholar. During his prime ministership, the Yadav kingdom reached its zenith; soon after his tenure, the Turkic emperor of Delhi, Alāuddin Khalji, and his successors ended the Yadav rule in southwestern India.

== Writings ==
- Hemadri wrote the encyclopedic book about dharma, the Chaturvarga Chintāmaṇi. It contains, among other subjects, thousands of Vratas along with the modus operandi for performing them.
- He wrote the commentary Āyurveda Rasāyan on the Ayurvedic Samhita "Ashtānga Hṛdayam", containing descriptions of various diseases and their remedies.
- A small historical book, the Hemādpanti Bakhar (Hemadpant's Chronicle) is credited to him.
- He created the Mestakas to standardize procedural sections of state administration.

== Cultural contributions ==
- Hemadri introduced the use of the Modi script for Marāthi (cursive style of writing Marathi) in government correspondence, a script which continued to be used till the end of Peshwa rule.
- He conceived of buildings and temples which did not use lime under his Hemadpanti architecture style.
- He introduced the plantation of pearl millet (Bājari) as a staple crop.
- He encouraged and supported many artists and writers like Bopadev and studied their books and presented his own criticism.

== See also ==
- Yadavas of Devagiri

== Sources ==
- Samasta Maharashtriya Brahman Potshakha (A Genealogy of all the Maharashtrian Brahmins, Marathi) by Dr. Abhaykumar Savaji
- Hemadri Athawa Hemadpant (Hemadri, or Hemadpant; Marathi) by Keshav Appa Padhye
- Maharashtra Saraswat (The Saraswats of Maharashtra, Marathi) by Vinayakrao Bhave
- Aitihasik Prastavana (Proposals on History, Marathi) by Vishwanath Kashinath Rajwade
