= Gunda (name) =

Gunda is a unisex given name and a surname. In Scandinavia it is used as a feminine given name and is the derivative of the German names ending in -gund such as Hildegund. It was a common name for girls in the Scandinavian countries in the late nineteenth century.

== Female given name ==
- Gunda Beeg, German writer and fashion designer
- Gunda Georg, American chemist
- Gunda Johansen (born 1952), Norwegian politician
- Gunda Mordhorst (1898–1980), American singer
- Gunda Niemann-Stirnemann (born 1966), German speed skater
- Gunda Trepp (born 1958), German author and journalist

== Male given name ==
- Gunda I (r. c. 815-?), Kakatiya ruler of India
- Gunda II (r. c. ?-865), Kakatiya ruler of India
- Gunda III (died c. 895 CE), Kakatiya ruler of India
- Gunda IV alias Pindi Gunda (r. c. 955–995), Kakatiya ruler of India
- Gunda Dhur, Indian tribal leader

== Surname ==
- Ambrose Gunda (died 2007), Zimbabwean military personnel
- Benedict Fodo Gunda, Kenyan politician
- Gunda Mallesh (1947–2020), Indian politician
- John Gunda, South African politician
- Peter Gunda (born 1973), Slovak football player

== Fictional characters ==
- Mama Gunda, one of the main characters in the movie Tarzan II

== See also ==
- Gunda (disambiguation)
