= Beta I =

Beta

Kakatiya ruler
- Reign: c. 995–1052
- Predecessor: Gunda IV
- Successor: Prola I
- Dynasty: Kakatiya
- Father: Gunda IV

Beta I (r. c. 995–1052), also known as Garudanka Beta or Garuda Beta, was a member of the Kakatiya dynasty of southern India. His father Gunda IV was a Rashtrakuta vassal, and was killed in a conflict with the Kalyani Chalukyas who usurped the power from the Rashtrakutas. Beta accepted the suzerainty of the Kalyani Chalukyas, participated in their war against the Cholas, and obtained Anamkonda as fief.

== Early life ==
Beta I's father Gunda IV was a loyal Rashtrakuta vassal until the Kalyani Chalukyas usurped the power from them. Gunda IV then attempted to carve out an independent principality at Kuravi, by displacing the Mudugonda Chalukyas, also known as the Bottus. The Bottus sought help of the Kalyani Chalukyas, whose general Viriyala Erra defeated and killed Gunda IV around 995 CE. The Bayyaram inscription and the 1124 CE Gudur inscription call Beta I "Garudanka Beta", probably to distinguish him from a Bottu chief of same name. The Gudur inscription suggests that Beta I was too young to put up a fight at the time of his father's death. The Kalyani Chalukyas reinstated Bottu Beta at Kuravi, and dispossessed Beta I of his father's acquisitions.

According to the Gudur inscription, Viriyala Erra's wife Kama-vasani (or Kamasani), who probably came from the Kakatiya family, helped Beta I. She approached the Chalukya emperor, and re-established the Kakatiya family. She is probably same as "Kuntala-devi" or "Erakasani" mentioned in the later, less reliable text Siddheshvara-charita. According to this text Kuntala-devi was the paternal aunt of Gunda's son Eruka-deva-raja (who can be identified with Beta I). She convinced the emperor Bhaskara-vibhu (probably Tailapa II or his son Satyashraya) to enroll Beta as a subordinate in the Anumakonda vishaya.

The Gudur inscription also states that a person named Sura killed Kadaya-nayaka of Velpugonda (modern Jaffargadh 25 miles SE of Warangal); set up Ravva-nripa at Velpugonda; and obtained from him Mogadupalli, Botipadu, Mavidlu, and the friendship of Garuda-raja. This suggests that Sura also helped Beta I ("Garuda-raja"), although his relationship to Beta I, Kama-vasani, or Viriyala Erra is not clear from the inscription. The nature of his help to Beta I is not clear either. Historian K. Harshavardhana Sarma theorizes that "Ravva-nripa" refers to Beta I. It is possible that Beta established a temporary capital at Velpugonda with Sura's help, and later obtained the Annamkonda (Anumakonda) vishaya as a fief from the Kalyani Chalukya king.

== Military career ==
According to the Bayyaram inscription, Beta I killed two chiefs named Anuma and Konda, and established his capital in their town. This suggests that the name of the Kakatiya capital Anumakonda derives from the names of these chiefs. The historicity of this account is doubtful as the name of the place is known to have existed even two centuries earlier (as the variant "Anamkonda"), during the reign of the Rashtrakuta king Amoghavarsha (r. c. 814–878 CE). It is possible that the Chalukya king allotted Beta I granted the Anumakonda territory to Beta I, and later, the Kakatiya family invented a myth to explain this otherwise uneventful occurrence.

Beta appears to have participated in a successful Chalukya campaign against the Cholas, during the reign of Someshvara I. This campaign was probably in response to Rajadhiraja Chola's invasion of the Chalukya capital in 1052 CE. Beta was an old man by this time, and probably relied on his commanders, such as Brahma of Recherla family. The Kazipet dargah inscription, issued during the reign of Beta I's grandson Beta II, states that Beta I "churned the ocean of the army of the Chola king and obtained Lakshmi". The 1135 CE Palampet inscription, issued during the reign of Ganapati, states that Brahma invaded Kanchi, destroyed the dignity of the Chola king in a battle, and achieved victory for his Kakatiya overlord. Although the inscription does not mention Brahma's overlord, his pedigree (and Beta I's known participation in a conflict against the Cholas) suggests that he served Beta I.

The last known record of Beta I is dated 1051 CE, and the first record of his son Prola I is dated 1053. So, he probably ruled during c. 1000–1052 CE.
