= Gunda IV =

Rashtrakuta general and a member of the Kakatiya dynasty

Gunda

Kakatiya ruler
- Reign: c. 955-995 CE
- Predecessor: Erra
- Successor: Beta I
- Dynasty: Kakatiya
- Father: Betiya (son of Erra)

Gunda IV (r. c. 955-995) alias Pindi-Gunda was a member of the Kakatiya dynasty of southern India. As a Rashtrakuta general, he helped the Vengi Chalukya prince Danarnava ascend the throne after a succession dispute. In 973 CE, after the collapse of the Rashtrakuta empire and the murder of Danarnava, he attempted to carve out an independent principality at Kuravi. The Kalyani Chalukyas, who had usurped the power from the Rashtrakutas, probably defeated and killed him, supported by the Mudugonda Chalukyas, the former rulers of Kuravi.

== In Rashtrakuta service ==
Gunda IV was a son of Betiya and a grandson of Erra. He seems to have succeeded his grandfather on the throne, as Betiya's name is omitted in the dynasty's Bayyaram inscription. The inscription states that Gunda IV, also known as Gundyana or Pindi-Gunda, beheaded all his enemies.

As a Rashtrakuta general, Gunda IV was probably stationed around the Kurravadi (possibly present-day Kuravi) region, which his grandfather Erra governed after the Rashtrakutas captured it from the Vengi Chalukyas. The Mudugonda Chalukyas, who were subordinate to the Vengi Chalukyas, recovered the area sometime later, and Erra appears to have been stationed at the Rashtrakuta-Chalukya frontier. In 944 CE, the Vengi Chalukya prince Danarnava disputed his brother Amma-raja II's ascension to the throne, and approached the Rashtrakuta king Krishna III for help. With Rashtrakuta help, Danarnava appears to have ousted Amma-raja II and ascended the throne for a short period.

At the request of Gunda IV, Danarnava issued the Mangallu inscription, which is an important source of information about the early Kakatiya history. He issued the grant under the title Vijayaditya which had also been adopted by his predecessor and brother Amma-raja II (it was customary for the crowned Chalukya kings to alternatively adopt the titles Vishnu-vardhana and Vijayaditya). The Mangallu inscription records the grant of Mangallu village in Natavadi vishaya as an agrahara to a brahmana named Dommana, who performed the Karpati-vrata ritual for Gunda.

== After the Rashtrakutas ==
In 973 CE, Tailapa II overthrew the Rashtrakuta king and established the Kalyani Chalukya dynasty. The same year, Jata Choda Bhima (a member of the Pedakallu branch of the Telugu Chodas) killed the Vengi Chalukya prince Danarnava. Gunda IV did not acknowledge the suzerainty of either of the usurpers, and carved out an independent principality at Kuravi after subjugating the Mudugonda Chalukyas.

The Mudugonda Chalukyas moved their capital to a place called Bottu, and adopted "Bottu" as their family name. The exact identity of this place is not certain, but it was located south of Mudugonda. According to the 1124 CE Gudur inscription issued by Viriyala Malla, his great-grandfather Viriyala Erra killed the enemy of one Bottu Beta and reinstated him at Kuravi. It is possible that this enemy was Gunda IV. The Mudugonda Chalukyas (or Bottus) probably accepted the suzerainty of the Kalyani Chalukyas, and sought their help in recapturing Mudugonda. The Kalyani Chalukya general Viriyala Erra probably defeated and killed Gunda IV, and reinstated the Bottus at Mudugonda.

The Gudur inscription states that Viriyala Erra's wife Kama-vasani, who probably came from the Kakatiya family, helped Gunda's son Beta I (alias Garuda Beta) re-establish the Kakatiya lineage.
