= Erra (Kakatiya dynasty) =

Kakatiya ruler
- Reign: early 10th century CE
- Predecessor: Gunda III
- Successor: Gunda IV (grandson)
- Dynasty: Kakatiya
- Father: Gunda III

Erra or Eriya (fl. early 10th century) was a member of the Kakatiya dynasty of southern India. As a Rashtrakuta vassal, he appears to have ruled the Kurravadi (possibly present-day Kuravi) region, which was captured by the Rashtrakutas from the Chalukyas of Vengi.

== Life ==
Erra was a son of the Rashtrakuta commander Gunda III (died c. 895 CE). He is also called "Eriya Rashtrakuta" in Kakatiya inscriptions; "Eriya" probably refers to the chief's personal name, and "Rashtrakuta" refers to his office.

Erra's father participated in a Rashtrakuta invasion of Vengi, and was killed by Irimartiganda, the son of the Chalukya king Bhima I. According to the Bayyaram inscription, Erra ruled Kurravadi and surrounding region. The identity of this place is not certain, but it was probably present-day Kuravi in Telangana. The Kuravi (or Koravi) inscription suggests that the place was captured by Krishna II ("Kannara Ballaha") during the reign of the Chalukya king Bhima I, and later, the Mudugonda Chalukya chief Gonaga recaptured it with Bhima's help. Thus, it appears that the Rashtrakuta king captured the Kurravadi region and appointed Erra as his governor there.

According to the c. 956 CE Mangallu inscription Erra's son was Betiya. It appears that Betiya died prematurely or did not play a significant role in the family history for some other reason. Because of this, his name is omitted in the Bayyaram inscription. Erra seems to have been succeeded by his grandson Gunda IV.
