= Trepp =

Trepp is a Germanic surname that may refer to

- Gunda Trepp (born 1958), German author and journalist
- Hans-Martin Trepp (1922–1970), Swiss ice hockey player
- Leo Trepp (1913–2010), German-born American rabbi
- Max Trepp (1924–1990), Swiss Olympic sprinter
- Willy Trepp (born 1938), Swiss track cyclist
