= Prola I =

Kakatiya ruler from 1052 to 1076

Prola
- Arigaja-Kesari

Kakatiya ruler
- Reign: c. 1052–1076 CE
- Predecessor: Beta I
- Successor: Beta II
- Dynasty: Kakatiya
- Father: Beta I

Prola I (r. c. 1052–1076 CE) was a member of the Kakatiya dynasty of southern India. As a Kalyani Chalukya vassal, he participated in prince Vikramaditya VI's campaigns, and consolidated the Kakatiya control over the area around Anumakonda by subjugating local chiefs. He obtained the Anumakonda vishaya and its neighbouring lands as a hereditary fief from the Chalukya king.

== Career ==
Prola I was a son of his predecessor Beta I. He probably ascended the throne around 1052 CE, as his father's last known record is dated 1051 CE, and his first record is dated 1053. He probably ruled until around 1076 CE, when his son Beta II succeeded him.

The Bayyaram inscription calls Prola I a lion to his elephant-like enemies (Arigaja-Kesari). Much of the information about Prola I's military career comes from the 1097–1098 CE Kazipet inscription issued by his grandson Durga-raja. This inscription credits him with the following achievements:

- Setting right the affairs of the Chakra-kuta vishaya
- Forcing Bhadranga to flee
- Defeating Konkana and spreading his fame all over the land
- Defeating the neighbouring chief Annaya of the great forest, the son of Kadparti Durga
- Killing Gonna, the Purukuta chief of Guna-sagara, in the battle

Bilhana's Vikramanka-deva-charitra states that as a prince, the Chalukya prince Vikramaditya VI campaigned in Konkana (1066 CE), Chakra-kuta or Chakra-kota (in present-day Chhattisgarh), and Vengi. Prola probably participated in these Chalukya campaigns, as a subordinate of Vikramaditya, during the reign of king Someshvara I. The Sanigaram inscription, issued during the reign of Someshvara, states that Mahasamanta Prola-rasa acquired kindness because of the king's kindness.

The identity of Bhadranga is not certain, but he was probably a descendant of the Vemulavada Chalukya family. "Bhadranga" is the Sanskrit form of "Baddega", a name born by multiple rulers of this family. Moreover, inscriptions of Beta I (1051 CE) and Prola I (1053 CE) have been found at Sanigaram near Vemulavada, which suggests that the kakatiyas campaigned in this region. Beta I's inscription records a grant to the Yuddhamalla Jinalaya, a shrine built by the Vemulavada Chalukya chief Yuddhamalla at Sanigaram. Prola I's Sanigaram inscription states that the Kalyani Chalukya king rewarded him with Sabbi-nadu, which was earlier controlled by the Vemulavada Chalukyas. All these evidences suggest that Bhadranga may have been a Vemulavada Chalukya scion who ruled in this area until Prola I subjugated him.

The identity of Annaya and Gonna is not certain, but they were probably petty chiefs.

In addition to the traditional garuda symbol of the Kakatiya family, Prola seems to have adopted varaha insignia, which was a royal emblem of their new overlords, the Chalukyas of Kalyani. The Anumakonda inscription of Prola II states that the family adopted the varaha symbol on their coins and cattle as a mark of gratitude to Prola I, who raised their status just like the mythical varaha who raised the earth. The rise in status credited to Prola I probably refers to him obtaining the Anumakonda vishaya and its neighbouring lands as a hereditary fief from the Chalukya king.

== Construction of the Kesari tank ==
Prola I commissioned an irrigation tank called Kesari-tataka or Jagati-kesari, named after his title (biruda) Kesari. This is attested by the Motupalli inscription of his grandson Ganapati, and an inscription at the Ekamranatha temple in Kanchi. This tank may be same as the Kesari-samudra mentioned in the Anumakonda inscription of Prola II. It may be identified with a tank near Kesamudram (a corruption of Kesari-samudra).
