= Trilinga Sanghameshwara Temple =

Sri Sri Sri Trilinga Sanghameshwara Swamy Devalayam

Religion
- Affiliation: Hinduism
- District: Karimnagar
- Deity: Sri Sanghameshwara swamy (Shiva) Parvathi Devi (Parvati)

Location
- Location: Vilasagar
- State: Telangana
- Country: India
- Interactive map of Sri Sri Sri Trilinga Sanghameshwara Swamy Devalayam
- Coordinates: 18°32′13″N 79°01′27″E

Architecture
- Type: Kakathiya

Website
- Sanghameshwara Temple

Sri Sri Sri Trilinga Sanghameshwara Swamy Devalayam is located in Vilasagar village of Karimnagar district in the state of Telangana, India. It is one of the unique ancient Shiva temples where three linga's in three inner sanctums (garbha gruha) in one temple facing east, north and south. Sri Trilinga Sanghameshwara swamy temple is situated 23 kilometers from Karimnagar town and 12 kilometers from Vemulawada known as “southern kasi”.

== History ==
Sri Sri Sri Trilinga Sanghameshwara Swamy Devalayam was constructed during the period of Kakatiya king Prola II (1115-1157 AD). The temple entrance from porch (Pravesha Mandapam), there are three inner sanctums (Garbha gruha) with three Antharaalam in three sides of Mukha Mandapam. The dimensions of each Antharaalam and inner sanctums (Garbha gruha) are identical 8 feet 8 inches and 8 feet. Mukha Mandapam dimensions are 24 feet and 24 feet. Three Shiva lingas are identically same in three inner sanctums which are 5 feet 5 inch height (paanipattam and Linga). Goddess Sri Parvathi Devi on the left-hand side and Sri Lakshmi Ganapathi located on the right-hand side in Mukha Mandapam. On each inner sanctum (garbha gruha) Shikharam is constructed in stepped pyramidal form which has ten steps for each. Kalasham is constructed on the top of each Shikharam which reminds Karnataka Kadamba temple structure. It is also identical to the Padmakshi temple located in Hanmakonda of Warangal district which is constructed in the name of “Mailamma” wife of minister “Bethana” during the period of Prola II according to the Archaeology Department.

== HariHara Kshethram ==

Sri Sri Sri Trilinga Sanghameshwara Swamy Devalayam is one of “HariHara Kshetram” for being Sri SeethaRamachandra Swamy Temple in the main Temple complex. Both Shivate & Vaishnavate festivals were celebrated by thousands of devotees. Mahasivarathri Jathara is a major and notified festival in this Devasthanam and Sreerama Navami is the 2nd major festival in this temple. On Mahasivarathri festival day, Maha Lingarchana & Lingodbhavakala Mahanyasa Purvaka Eakadasha Rudrabhishekam would be performed according to Smartha Agama Shasthra. On the next day of Mahasivarathri Shiva Kalyana mahothsavam and Annadanam organized by the committee and youth organizations. Sri Hanuman Jayanthi, Sri Ganesh Navarathri, Sri Devi Navarathrotsavams, Sravana Masotsavam, Kartheeka Masotsavam, Sri Geetha Jayanthi are the other major festivals celebrated by devotees.

== Sri SeethaRamachandra Swamy Temple ==
Sri SeethaRamachandra Swamy Temple located North-West side of Sri Trilinga Sanghameshwara swamy temple. Sri SeethaRamachandra Swamy Temple Re-open ceremony was inaugurated by "Sri Sri Sri Thridhandi Chinna Jeeyar Swamy". At the time of inauguration Chinna Jeeyar Swamy told “I have seen many SeethaRamachandra Swamy Temples allover but in this temple idol (Vigraham) of SeethaRamachandra Swamy is attractive and mahimanvitham after Bhadhrachalam temple idol (Vigraham)”. On the day of Sreerama Navami Sri SeethaRamachandra swamy Kalyanam celebrated by thousands of devotees and Annadanam program will be organized every year.
