= Gunda III =

Gunda

Kakatiya ruler
- Predecessor: Gunda II
- Successor: Erra
- Died: c. 895 CE
- Dynasty: Kakatiya
- Father: Gunda II

Gunda III (died c. 895 CE), also known as Gundyana or Gundana, was a member of the Kakatiya dynasty of southern India. He served the Rashtrakuta king Krishna II, and died during Krishna's invasion of the Vengi Chalukya kingdom. He is the earliest known member of the Kakatiya family to have been in the Telugu-speaking region.

== Career ==
Gunda III was a son of Gunda II, and a great-grandson of Venna, the earliest known ruler of the Kakatiya family which traced its lineage to Durjaya, a descendant of Karikala Chola. Gunda III served as a Rashtrakuta commander in the Telugu-spe aking region, and is the earliest known member of the Kakatiya family to have been present in this region. The Mangallu inscription calls him "Gundyana Rashtrakuta" (or Gundana) and "Samanta Votti" (a mistake for Vitti).

Gunda III finds a mention in the c. 956 CE Mangallu inscription (issued at the request of his great-grandson Gunda IV), and possibly the undated Masulipatnam inscription (issued by the Vengi Chalukya king Bhima I). These inscriptions suggest that he was a vassal of the Rashtrakuta king Krishna II, and participated in the Rashtrakuta invasion of the Vengi Chalukya kingdom, around 895 CE. Gunda attacked Peruvanguru (a village near Nidadavolu) in order to create a diversion and allow his master to enter the Chalukya capital Vata (Vijayawada). During this attack, he was killed by Irimartiganda, a son of the Chalukya king Bhima I.

According to the Mangallu inscription, Gunda III died a heroic death during a Rashtrakuta invasion of the Vengi Chalukya kingdom. Gunda's Rashtrakuta overlord is called "Vallabhesha" in the inscription, and may be identified with Krishna II . The inscription states that Gundana's effort allowed the Rashtrakuta king to enter the town of Vata (Vijayawada). The Masulipatnam inscription states that Irimartiganda killed the Rashtrakuta general ('dandena) Gundyana, identified with Gunda III by modern historians, at Peruvanguru.

Gunda III was succeeded by Erra, who ruled the Kurravadi region, possibly the area around present-day Kuravi in Telangana.
