= Gunda (disambiguation) =

Gunda is a genus of moths.

Gunda may also refer to:

- Gunda (1998 film), an Indian action film
- Gunda (1976 film), a Bangladeshi film
- Gunda (2020 film), an American-Norwegian documentary film
- Cordia dichotoma or gunda, in Hindi
- Gunda (name), list of people named Gunda

== See also ==
- Goonda, term for a hired thug
