= Motupalli =

Village in Andhra Pradesh, India

Motupalli is a village in Chinaganjam Mandal, Bapatla district in the Indian state of Andhra Pradesh. It is located 10 km away from Chinaganjam town. It is the site of a historic port city, one of the most ancient in India, dating back to at least the 2nd century CE. Motupalli served as a major trading hub for the region, connecting it with other parts of India, as well as with Southeast Asia, China, and the Middle East. Motupalli is home to a number of important religious and cultural sites. These include the Veerabhadra Swamy Temple, the Ramalingeswara Swamy Temple, and the Buddhist stupas. The village is also known for its traditional arts and crafts, such as weaving, pottery, and metalwork.

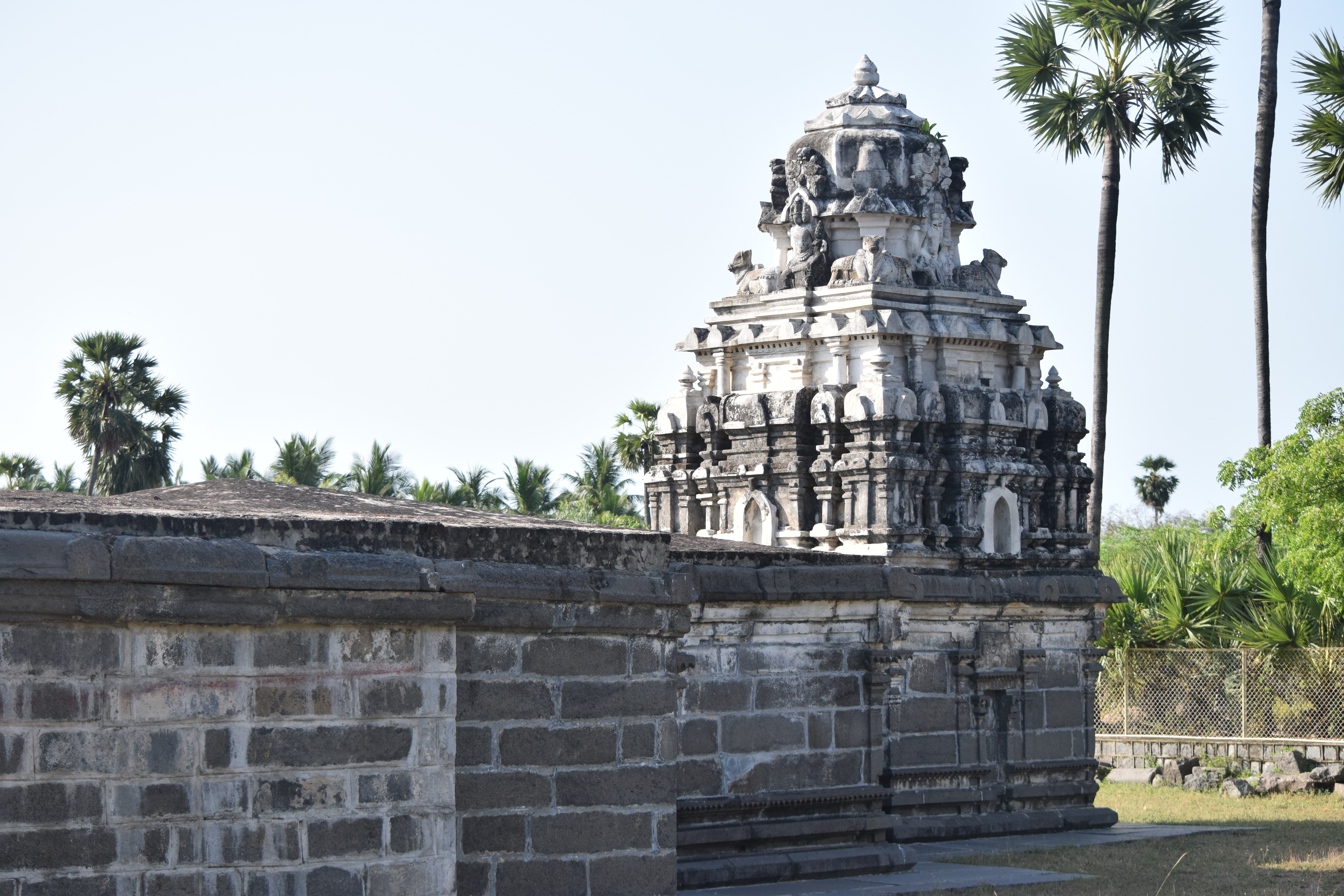
Motupalli Chola temple

== History ==
Motupalli has been ruled by various dynasties over the centuries, including the Imperial Cholas, the Kakatiyas, the Reddys, the Emperors of Vijayanagara and the Qutub Shahis. The village is mentioned as a bustling port in several historical texts, including the writings of Ptolemy, Pliny and Marco Polo. In the 12th century, Motupalli was a major center of trade for horses, and it is said that the Kakatiya king Ganapati Deva imported Arabian horses through this port.. It served as the primary port of the Kakatiya realm with Marco Polo referring to the Kakatiya state as the Kingdom of Motupalli.
