= Vanam Vari Krishnapuram =

Vanam Vari Krishnapuram Vanam Vari Kistapuram
- village
- Nickname: vkp
- Location in Telangana, India Vanam Vari Krishnapuram (India)
- Coordinates: 17°07′15″N 80°08′17″E
- Country: India
- State: Telangana
- District: Khammam
- Mandal: Mudigonda
- Village or Post: Vanam Vari Krishnapuram
- Founded: 1800 AD

Government
  - Type: President
  - President: Yelagonda Thupakula
- Elevation: 130 m (430 ft)

Population
  - Total: 2,800

Languages
  - Official: Telugu
- Time zone: UTC+5:30 (IST)
- PIN: 507158
- Telephone code: 08742
- Lok Sabha constituency: Khammam
- Vidhan Sabha constituency: Madhira

Vanam Vari Krishnapuram is an Indian village in Mudigonda mandal, Khammam district in the Indian state of Telangana.

== Geography ==
It is located 23 km from Khammam, the headquarters of the Khammam District of Andhra Pradesh, India. Vanam Vari Krishnapuram is located along the Khammam-Vallabi main road.

== Agriculture ==
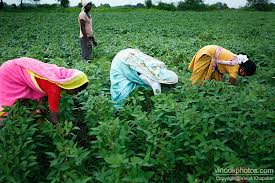
Agriculture Field1

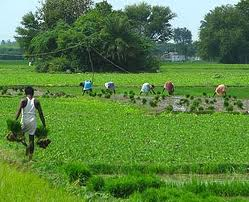
Agriculture Field2

Agriculture is the main occupation for villagers. The most common crops are rice, cotton and chilli. Other commercial crops such as white popinac and sugarcane, as well as mango and coconut plantations have flourished.

Water for agriculture is primarily drawn from Nagarjuna Sagar Dam's left canal (a.k.a. Lal Bahadur Shastri Canal)/N.S Canal, which flows through the village. Other sources are wells and Vanam Vari Krishnapuram Cheruvu which draws water from N.S Canal.

== Transport ==
The village is located on one of the major routes in Mudigonda Mandal.

APSRTC buses to Vallabhi/Pedamandava/Vallapuram run through the village.
