= Parichchedi =

Medieval Andhra dynasty

The Parichchedis were a medieval chiefly lineage in Andhra.

== History ==
The Parichchedis were initially the samantas (vassals) of the Chalukyas. They originated from social groups such as the besta (fisherman) and peasant groups of the Shudra varna. After becoming rulers, they claimed Kshatriya status. They also claimed descent from Durjaya, a legendary chieftain of ancient Andhra. These claims of Kshatriya origin and descent from semi-mythical and mythical persons demonstrate a tendency of the medieval Brahmanical society to absorb lower caste rulers into Kshatriya fold. They were staunch patrons of Hindu Dharma in contrast to the Chalukyas, who initially were patrons of Jainism.
