= Durgaraja =

Kakatiya ruler from 1108 to 1116

- 'Tribhuvana-malla'

Kakatiya ruler
- Reign: c. 1108–1116 CE
- Predecessor: Beta II
- Successor: Prola II
- Dynasty: Kakatiya
- Father: Beta II

Durga-raja (r. c. 1108–1116?) was a member of the Kakatiya dynasty of southern India. He is attested by only one record - the 1098 CE Kazipet dargah inscription, which was issued during the reign of his father Beta II. According to one theory, he probably ruled for a short period and rebelled against his Kalyani Chalukya overlord, before being subjugated by his brother Prola II who remained loyal to the Chalukyas.

== As a prince ==
Durga-raja was a son of Beta II, whose last extant inscription is dated 1108 CE. Durga-raja is attested by the earlier 1098 CE Kazipet inscription, which suggests that Beta commissioned the construction of locality called Shiva-pura in Anumakonda, and of a shrine called Beteshvara ("Lord of Beta"). Durga-raja granted Shiva-pura to the Shaivite ascetic Rameshvara Pandita on 24 November 1090, on the occasion of a solar eclipse. Rameshvara belonged to the Kalamukha sect, and was the acharya of Mallikarjuna-Shila matha of Shriparvata. Another part of the Kazipet inscription states that a minister of Durga-raja established a Kirti-stambha in 1098 CE.

Since the reign of Beta II is known to have lasted until 1108 CE, the Kazipet inscription was presumably issued during his father's reign, and Durga-raja was actively involved in administration during this period. The inscription calls him "Durga-bhupala" and mentions his hereditary title Tribhuvana-malla. It is composed in Sanskrit and Kannada languages.

Durgaraja was probably anointed as the crown prince around 1098 CE, receiving the titles Tribhuvana-malla and Chalamarti-ganda.

== Career ==
Other than the 1098 CE Kazipet inscription, no epigraphic or literary record of the Kakatiya dynasty mentions Durga-raja. The last inscription from the reign of Durga-raja's father Beta II is the 1107 CE Sanigaram inscription. The next extant Kakatiya inscription is the 1117 CE Padamakshi temple inscription from the reign of Durga-raja's brother Prola II. Thus, if Durga-raja ever ruled, he must have done so sometime between 1108 and 1117 CE.

Between 1107 and 1117 CE, the Sabbi-nadu region (comprising the area around Vemulavada and Sanigaram) seems to have been in some kind of political turmoil. Epigraphic evidence suggests that a number of local chiefs died during this period - Beta II, Durga-raja, Meda I of Polavasa, and Meda's son Jagaddeva; the Paramara prince Jagaddeva departed from the region during this period.

The Kottapalli inscription from the reign of the later Kakatiya king Ganapati states that Prola II was so benevolent that he protected even his brother's son. This suggests that Durga-raja's rule came to a sudden end, and his son had to seek asylum with Prola II. Historian P.V.P. Sastry speculates that Durga-raja joined a rebellion against the Chalukya king, allying with the Paramara prince Jagaddeva. Prola stayed loyal to the Chalukyas, defeated the rebels, and usurped the power from Durga-raja. Sastry's theory is based on the 1120 CE Matedu inscription issued by Prola II's vassal Vembola Boddama Mallenayaka of the Pulinda family. This inscription states that Mallenayaka's father Reva defeated the agnates (dāyas) of the Kakatiya family.
