= Kamalapuram, Khammam district =

Kamalapuram
- Village
- Location in Telangana, India
- Coordinates: 17.11°N 80.03°E
- Country: India
- State: Telangana
- District: Khammam district

Government
  - Type: Panchayat
- Elevation: 107 m (351 ft)

Population (2012)
  - Total: 3,213

Languages
  - Official: Telugu
- Time zone: UTC+5:30 (IST)
- Mandal (sub-division): Mudigonda
- Lok Sabha constituency: Khammam
- Sex ratio: 1587 ♂/ 1656 ♀
- Website: Kamalapuram

Kamalapuram is a panchayat in the Khammam district of the Indian state of Telangana. According to the 2011 Indian Census, the sub-district code of the Kamalapuram block is 05224.

== Geography ==
Kamalapuram is located the middle of the villages of the Yalagondaswamy, with the village of Gattu to the east, Nachepalli to the west, Vanamvari Kistapuram to the north, and Banapuram to the south. The village of Kamalapuram occupies 2,909 acres (1,177 ha) of land at an average elevation of about 107 metres (351 ft) above sea level. The total area of Kamalapuram is 181 km^{2}.

== Agriculture and civil affairs ==
Agriculture is the main occupation of Kamalapuram residents, with cotton and red chili being the main crops. 1,914 acres (775 ha) of land is currently under cultivation in Kamalapuram. Paddy fields are the most common type of arable land in the region.

People of various castes and religions live in Kamalapuram. The languages most commonly spoken are Telugu and Urdu.

The village has two primary schools: Zilla Parishad School and Anganwadi Centre. Drinking water is supplied from a panchayat-administrated reservoir.

== Political Representation ==
- Parliament Constituency: Khammam
- Member Of Parliament: Sri Nama nageshwar rao
- Assembly Constituency: Madhira
- MLA : Sri Mallu Bhatti Vikramarka
- Sarpanch: Smt Valluri Varalakshmi Garu
- Upa Sarpanch : Avasani Venkateshwarlu
- MPTC: Sri Devarapalli Adinarayana Reddy Garu

== Demographics ==
Gender	Population
Male	25,969
Female	26,199
Total	52,168

The Kamalapuram area hosts a population of 52,168 people. There are 12,664 houses in the sub-district, divided between the 24 villages in the Kamalapuram block.
