= Prola II =

Kakatiya chief from 1116 to 1157

Prola

Kakatiya chief
- Reign: (c. 1116–1157 CE)
- Predecessor: Durgaraja (c. 1108–1116 CE)
- Successor: Rudradeva
- Dynasty: Kakatiya
- Father: Beta II

Prola II (r. c. 1116-1157 CE) was a Kakatiya chief who ruled the area around Anumakomda (modern Hanamkonda) as a vassal of the Kalyani Chalukyas. He was the father of Rudra-deva, the first sovereign ruler of the Kakatiya family.

Prola II was a son of the Kakatiya chief Beta II, and probably succeeded his elder brother Durga-raja on the throne. Sometime before Prola II's ascension, the Paramara prince Jagaddeva, a former Chalukya vassal, attacked Anumakomda, but Prola II repulsed this attack.

After ascending the Kakatiya throne, Prola II subjugated several chiefs who had rebelled against the Chalukya suzerainty. He defeated the rebel Chalukya general Govinda, and reinstated the Choda chief Udaya II as the ruler of Panugallu (modern Panagal). He captured Kumara Tailapa, a brother of the Chalukya king Someshvara III and a governor, who had asserted sovereignty. He beheaded Gumda of Mantrakuta, and forced Eda of Manyaka to retreat, probably during an anti-rebel campaign of the Chalukya king Jagadeka-malla II.

Prola died in a battle against an alliance of chiefs, probably during an attempt to conquer the coastal Andhra region. His sons Rudra-deva and Maha-deva succeeded him on the throne.

== Early life ==
Prola II was a son of Beta II, and had a brother named Durga-raja. The last inscription from the reign of Prola II's father is the 1107 CE Sanigaram inscription. The earlier, 1098 CE Kazipet dargah inscription suggests that Prola II's brother Durga-raja was the crown prince. The earliest inscription from Prola II's reign is the 1117 CE Padamakshi Temple inscription. Thus, it is possible that Durga-raja preceded Prola II, ruling sometime between 1108 and 1117 CE. Prola's reign probably started sometime during 1116 CE.

== Military career ==
=== Repulsion of Jagaddeva's attack ===
The 19 January 1163 CE Anumakomda inscription of Prola II's son Rudra-deva states that Prola II quickly repulsed Jagaddeva's invasion of Anumakomda. The Ganapeshvaram (Ganapeswaram) inscription of his grandson Ganapati does not mention this achievement while listing the military victories achieved during Prola's reign, which suggests that this attack happened before Prola's ascension to the throne.

During 1107-1117 CE, the Sabbi-nadu region (centered around Vemulavada) seems to have been in some kind of political turmoil. Epigraphic evidence suggests that a number of local chiefs died during this period - Beta II, Durga-raja, Meda I of Polavasa, and Meda's son Jagaddeva; the Paramara prince Jagaddeva departed from the region during this period. The Kottapalli inscription of Ganapati states that Prola II was so benevolent that he protected even his brother's son. This suggests that Durga-raja's rule came to a sudden end, and his son had to seek asylum with Prola II.

Historian P.V.P. Sastry theorizes that the Paramara prince Jagaddeva and the Polavasa chief Meda-raja rebelled against the Chalukya king, since inscriptions during 1108-1112 CE do not mention any overlord. Jagaddeva may have been unhappy because the Chalukya king transferred the control of the Sabbi-1000 province (the Sabbi-nadu region with 1000 villages) from him to Prola II's father Beta II. The rebels probably attacked the Kakatiya stronghold of Anumakonda, but Prola II defeated them. It is not clear if this event occurred during the reign of Prola II's father Beta II or after his death.

Sastry speculates that Prola II's brother Durga-raja joined the rebellion against the Chalukya king. Prola stayed loyal to the Chalukyas, defeated the rebels, and usurped the power from Durga-raja. Sastry's theory is based on the 1120 CE Matedu inscription issued by Prola II's vassal Vembola Boddama Mallenayaka of the Pulinda family. This inscription states that Mallenayaka's father Reva defeated the agnates (dāyas) of the Kakatiya family. Epigraphic evidence suggests that the ascension of Prola II was sanctioned by the Chalukya king as well as the family preceptor Rameshvara Pandita. The Kottapalli inscription praises him as the one who elevated the family (kula-vardhana).

=== Victory against Govinda and reinstatement of Udaya ===
The Kakatiya inscriptions suggest that Prola II defeated another Chalukya general named Govinda, and reinstated the Choda chief Udaya II as ruler. The 1163 CE Anumakomda inscription states that Prola captured Govinda-raja, then released him, and bestowed his kingdom on Udaya-raja. The Ganapeshvaram inscription states that he forced Govinda-damdesha (general) to flee the battlefield, and reinstated Chododaya ("Udaya the Choda") to his position.

Kumara Tailapa was a younger brother the Chalukya king Someshvara III, and had been governing the Kanduru-nadu province since the reign of their father Vikramaditya VI. The Panugallu-rajya territory in this region was contested among members of the Choda chiefs of Kanduru, who were Chalukya vassals. After the death of the Choda chief Udaya I, Gokarna probably succeeded him on the throne of Panugallu. It appears that differences developed between Gokarna and other members of the Choda family - Gokarna's elder brother Bhima III and Bhima's nephew Shridevi-Tondaya, who rebelled against the Chalukya suzerainty. In 1128 CE, Bhima III killed Gokarna, with the support of the Chalukya general (damdesha) Govinda. Meanwhile, Tailapa seems to have indirectly encouraged the rebellion against his brother Someshvara III, and possibly divided Panugallu-rajya between Shridevi-Tondaya and Govinda.

Historian P.V.P Sastry identifies Govinda with the governor of Komdapalli-sima, who was a nephew of Anantapala danda-nayaka. M. Somasekhara Sharma identified him with Govinda, the son of Bagi Madimayya nayaka (an officer of Vengi), but Sastry notes that this no historical records attest this person's presence in the Telangana region at the time.

Someshvara III seems to have dispatched Prola II against the rebels. Sometime during 1130-1136 CE, Prola reinstated Udaya II, the son of Gokarna I, as the ruler of Panugallu-rajya. After the death of Prola II, his son Rudra defeated Bhima.

=== Capture of Tailapa ===
During the last years of the Chalukya king Someshvara III, his brother Tailapa, appears to have asserted independence. Tailapa the governor of the Kanduru-nadu province, portrays himself as a sovereign king in a 1137 CE inscription. Someshvara's successor Jagadeka-malla II appears to have marched against Tailapa and other rebels after ascending the throne, and Prola II participated in this campaign as a Chalukya vassal.

The 1163 CE Anumakomda inscription states that Prola captured Tailpa-deva in war, and then released him out of "loyalty and affection". The Ganapeshvaram inscription states that Prola led Tailapa-deva off after attacking the elephants and horses.

Earlier historians identified Tailapa with the Chalukya king Tailapa III, and believed that Prola II established the Chalukya sovereignty by revolting against him, but there is little evidence to support this theory.

== Beheading of Gumda ==
After subjugating Tailapa, the Chalukya king Jagadeka-malla appears to have marched against other rebel chiefs, including Meda-raja I of Polavasa, his younger brother Gumda of Mantrakuta (or Manthena-vishaya), and Eda of Manyaka. By the early 1120s, Meda I and Gumda had stopped acknowledging Chalukya suzerainty, as attested by their 1122 CE Govindapuram inscription and other epigraphs, which do not refer to any overlord.

Prola II participated in this campaign as a Chalukya subordinate, and beheaded Gumda. The 1163 CE Anumakomda inscription states that Prola II beheaded Gumda, the lord of Mantrakuta. The Ganapeshvaram inscription states that Prola killed Manthena Gunda (Gumda) with sword. According to the Thousand Pillar Temple inscription, Gumda was humiliated by having his head shaved and having his chest marked with varaha, a Chalukya and Kakatiya emblem.

=== Subjugation of Eda ===
The 1163 CE Anumakomda inscription states that Prola forced Eda to flee the battlefield in presence of the king despite being invited to fight. A fragmentary inscription, found at Anumakomda (Hanamkonda) and issued by Gangadhara (a minister of Prola II's son Rudra), also states that Prola forced Eda-bhupala of Manyaka "with his hair untied before the king Jagadeka-malla". Eda was probably same as a petty chief of that name attested by an undated fragmentary inscription found at Ramagundam. In this inscription, he bears the titles Lattalur-puravaradhishvara, Suvarna-garuda-dhvaja, and Maha-mandaleshvara, which are similar to Meda's titles in the Polavasa inscription.

Eda was probably a relative of Gumda, and probably fled from the battlefield during the battle between Prola and Gumda.

== Death ==
Prola's kingdom probably extended from Godavari River in the north to the Krishna River in the south. The western boundary of his kingdom is uncertain; in the east, he was unable to capture Vengi in coastal Andhra region, and died in a battle against a confederacy of the local chiefs.

During his last years, Prola II invaded the Velanati Choda kingdom, then ruled by Gonka II. He was killed in a battle fought around 1157 or 1158 during this invasion. Multiple feudatory chiefs appear to have fought against him in this battle, as several of them claim the responsibility for killing him in their inscriptions:

- The 1158 CE Daksharamam inscription of the Kota queen Surama-mahadevi states that her husband Kota-chodaya-raja held the title Kakati-Prola-nirdahana ("the one who destroyed the Kakatiya Prola").
- The 1195 CE Pithapuram pillar inscription of Manma Satya and Malli-deva, the Haihaya chiefs of Kona country, describes Manma Satya as "the one whose throne was adorned by the crown on the head of Proḍa-kshitipala". Proḍa is a variant of Prola.
- Another chief - Mahadeva-raja of the Surya-vamsa family, assumes the title Prodari-badabanala ("a submarine fire to the enemy named Prola"), which suggests that he also participated in the battle that led to Prola's death. Mahadeva-raja served the Vengi Chalukya king Malla Vishnu-vardhana of the Beta Vijayaditya line, and bears this title in an inscription of his overlord.

The 1149 Sanigaram inscription of Prola II is the last known record of the Kakatiyas as vassals. His son and successor Rudra proclaimed sovereignty in 1163 CE.

== Personal life ==
Prola II married Muppamamba (alias Muppama), a sister of the Chalukya vassal Natavadi Durgga-raja, who held a fief near Inugurti (Inugurthy). He had five sons: Rudra-deva, Maha-deva, Harihara, Ganapati (not to be confused with his grandson), and Durgga-raja.

Rudra-deva succeeded him on the throne, followed by Maha-deva. Durggaraja (or Durga-raja), attested by the 1163 CE Daksharamam inscription, held the appanage of Repalli (or Repolla), and is sometimes called "Repalli Durggaraja"

The Yenamadala inscription of Ganapambika names "Madhava" as a son of Prola II, but this appears to be a mistake for "Mahadeva" since the inscription describes Madhava as the father of Ganapati.

== Religion ==
Prola II was a Shaivite. A fragmentary record from Anumakomda suggests that he patronized the Shaivite ascetic Rameshvara Pandita, who had earlier received patronage of his brother Durga-raja II. The 1098 CE Kazipet dargah inscription suggests that Durga-raja granted the Shiva-pura locality constructed by their father Beta II to Rameshvara, who belonged to the Kalamukha sect, and was the acharya of Mallikarjuna-Shila matha of Shriparvata. The construction of the Swayambhu temple at Warangal is ascribed to the period of Prola II. His queen was also a Shaivite, and installed an image of Jalandara Bhairava - an aspect of Shiva - on a hill north-west of Inugurthy.

According to the Anumakomda inscription, Prola II crossed the Krishna river, worshipped the god Mallikarjuna at Shrishaila, and set up a victory pillar there. This victory pillar is not traceable now. The Trilinga Sanghameshwara Temple was constructed during his reign.

Prola honoured the Jain mendicant Tridandi at Hidambasram (present-day Madikonda hill). The 1117 CE Padmakshi Temple inscription records the construction of a Jaina shrine named Kadalalaya-basadi, and a gift of land to this shrine. Mailama, the wife of Prola's minister Betana-pergada, commissioned the shrine. Medarasa of Ugravadi (Meda II), who held the office of Maha-mandaleshvara, donated the land.

== See also ==
- Rudrama Devi, a queen of the Kakatiya dynasty
- Prataparudra, the last of the Kakatiya rulers
