= Kakatiya dynasty =

South Indian dynasty (1163–1323)

- 1163–1323
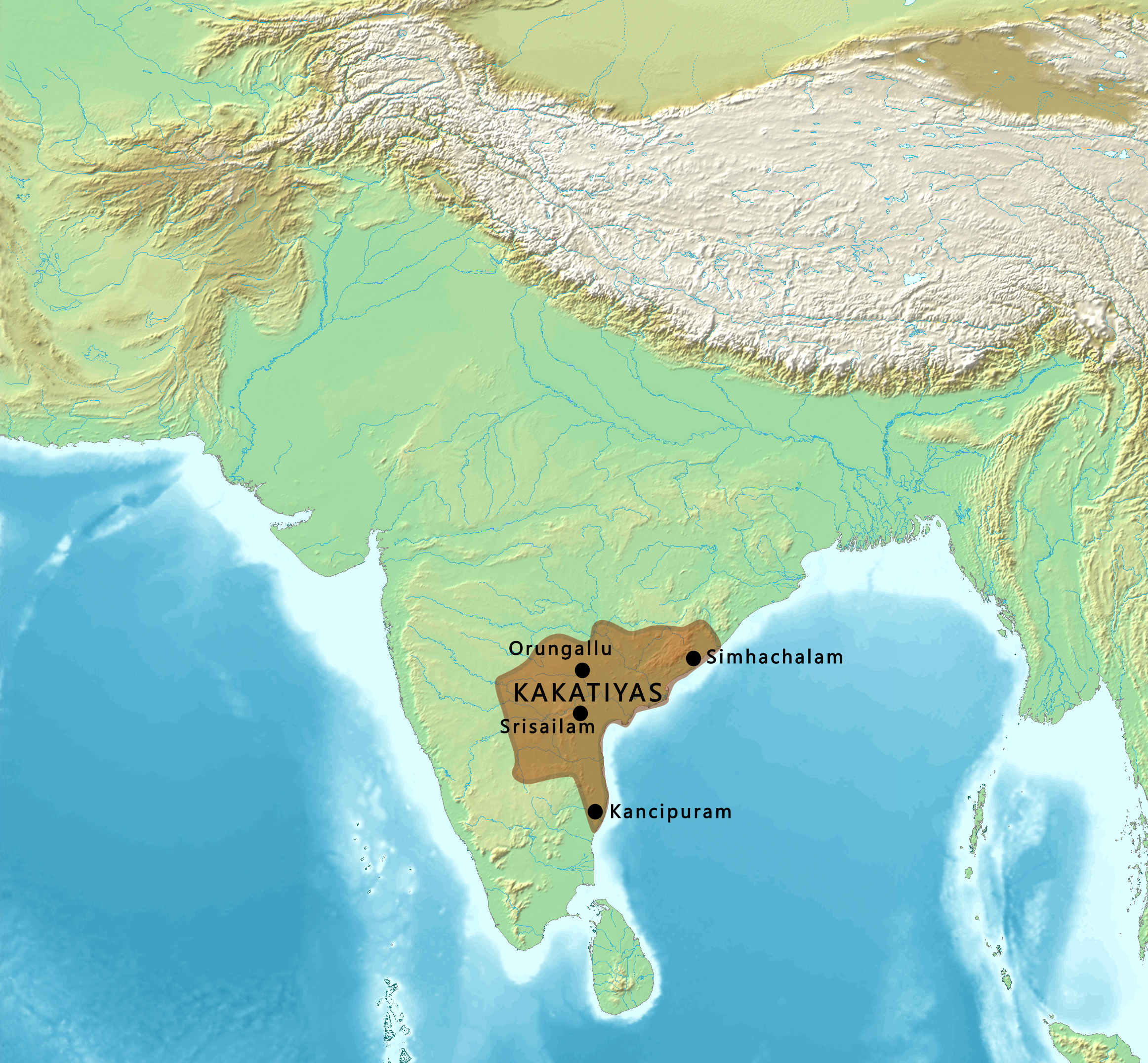
- Map of the Kakatiyas, c. 1150–1300 CE.
- Status: Dynasty
- Capital: Orugallu
- Common languages: Telugu; Sanskrit; Kannada
- Religion: Hinduism, Jainism
- Government: Monarchy
- King
- History
  - Earliest rulers: c. 800
  - Established: 1163
  - Siege of Warangal: 9 November 1323
Preceded by
| Eastern Chalukyas |
| Western Chalukya Empire |
Succeeded by
| Reddi Kingdom |
| Musunuri Nayakas |
| Delhi Sultanate |
| Bahmani Sultanate |
| Vijayanagara Empire |
- Today part of: India

The Kakatiya dynasty (IAST: Kākatīya) (Note: Sanskrit: काकतीय; romanised: kākatīya; Telugu: కాకతీయులు; Kannada: ಕಾಕತೀಯ) was a Telugu dynasty that ruled most of eastern Deccan region in present-day India between 12th and 14th centuries. Their territory comprised much of the present day Telangana and Andhra Pradesh, parts of eastern Karnataka, northern Tamil Nadu, and southern Odisha. Their capital was Orugallu, now known as Warangal.

Early Kakatiya rulers served as feudatories to Rashtrakutas and Western Chalukyas for over two centuries. They assumed sovereignty under Rudradeva in 1163 CE by suppressing other Chalukya subordinates in the Telangana region. Ganapati Deva (r. 1199–1262) significantly expanded Kakatiya lands during the 1230s and brought under Kakatiya control the Telugu-speaking lowland delta areas around the Godavari and Krishna rivers. Ganapati Deva was succeeded by Rudrama Devi (r. 1262–1289) who is one of the few queen regnants in Indian history. Marco Polo, who visited India around 1289–1293, made note of Rudrama Devi's rule and nature in flattering terms. She successfully repelled the attacks of Yadavas (Seuna) of Devagiri into the Kakatiyan territory.

In 1303, Alauddin Khalji, the emperor of the Delhi Sultanate invaded the Kakatiya territory which ended up as a disaster for the Turks. (Note: Sharma (1957, p. 234): "Vennama, the son of Dāma, led his troops in a defeat of the Turks very probably during Ala-ud-din Khalji's first invasion of Telangana in 1303. This success against the Turkish arms took place in the battle of Upparapalli, where Potuganti Maili is said to have put the enemies to flight.") But after the successful siege of Warangal in 1310, Prataparudra II was forced to pay annual tribute to Delhi. Another attack by Ulugh Khan (i.e. Tughluq) in 1323 saw stiff resistance by the Kakatiyan army, but they were finally defeated. The demise of the Kakatiya dynasty resulted in confusion and anarchy under alien rulers for some time, before Musunuri Nayakas united the various Telugu clans and recovered Warangal from the Delhi Sultanate.

The Kakatiyas unified the distinct upland and lowland cultures of Telugu lands, which brought way for the cultural affinity between those who spoke the Telugu language to flourish. The Kakatiya period introduced the construction of reservoirs for irrigation in the uplands called "tanks", many of which are still in use today. They were egalitarian in nature and anyone, regardless of birth, could acquire the nayaka title that denoted the warrior status. They recruited peasants into the military, which resulted in a new warrior class and provided social mobility. The Kakatiya era also saw the development of a distinct style of architecture that improved and innovated upon the existing modes. The most notable examples are the Thousand Pillar Temple in Hanamkonda, Ramappa Temple in Palampet, Warangal Fort, Golconda Fort and Kota Gullu in Ghanpur.

== Etymology and names ==
Recently unearthed 9th and 10th century Vengi Chalukya copper plates at Kodad in Suryapet district have provided insights into the origin of the dynasty’s name. Inscribed in Sanskrit in Telugu script, these records date back to 890 CE and document early Kakatiya ancestors such as Saamanta Vetti and Vigraha Vetti, and chiefs Gunda I, Gunda II, Gunda III who served as military commanders under the Vengi Chalukya king Bhima I. The inscriptions record that these early chiefs were granted and endowed temples in a village named Kakarti, located near Kondapalli. Kodad plates provide the oldest epigraphic evidence of the dynasty’s name, linking the family name to ancestral seat in Kakarti.

Studies of the inscriptions and coinage by the historian Dineshchandra Sircar reveal that there was no contemporary standard spelling of the family name. Variants include Kakatiya, Kakatiyya, Kakita, Kakati and Kakatya. The family name was often prefixed to the name of the monarch, giving constructs such as Kakatiya-Prataparudra. Some of the monarchs also had alternate names; for example, Venkata and Venkataraya may have been alternate names of Prataparuda I, with the former appearing on a coin in the form Venkata-Kakatiya. (Note: Kakatiya coins bore the Nandinagari script.(Prasad 1988, p. 9))

Kakatiya inscriptions suggest that the family's name derives from the name of a place called Kakati. The Bayyaram tank inscription from the reign of Ganapati Deva states that the Kakatiya chief Venna (c. 9th century) resided at Kakati, because of which his descendants came to be known as Kakatishas ("lords of Kakati"). Ganapati Deva's Garavapadu charter traces the family's ancestry to Durjaya, a legendary chieftain of ancient Andhra and a descendant of Karikala Chola. According to this account, Karikala arrived at Kakati during a hunting expedition, and set up his camp there. The modern identity of Kakati is uncertain: different historians have variously attempted to identify it with modern Kakati village in Karnataka and Kanker in Chhattisgarh. Siddheshvara-Charitra, a later literary work, states that the ancestors of the Kakatiya family lived at Kandarapura (identified with modern Kandhar in Maharashtra). However, no other evidence supports this tradition. Later, the Kakatiya capital Orugallu (present-day Warangal) was also called "Kakati-pura" ("Kakati town"), as attested by some inscriptions of the dynasty.

Kumarasvami Somapithin, in his 15th-century commentary on Vidynatha's Prataparudra-Yashobhushanam or Prataparudriya states that the family was named after their tutelary goddess Kakati, a form of Durga. It is possible that the early Kakatiya chiefs resided at a place called Kakati, which had a shrine of their tutelary goddess. Although the Hindu mythological texts do not mention any such form of Durga, the worship of a goddess named Kakati is attested by several other sources. For example, Vallabharaya's Krida-bhiramamu mentions an image of Kakatamma ("Mother Kakati") in the Kakatiya capital Orugallu. The 16th century Shitap Khan inscription mentions the reinstallation of the image of the Hindu goddess Jaganmatruka (mother of the universe) and the lotus seat of the Kakatirajya, which had been destroyed by the Turushkas (Turkic people). According to one theory, Kakati was originally a Jain goddess (possibly Padmavati) and later came to be regarded as a form of Durga.

== Sources ==
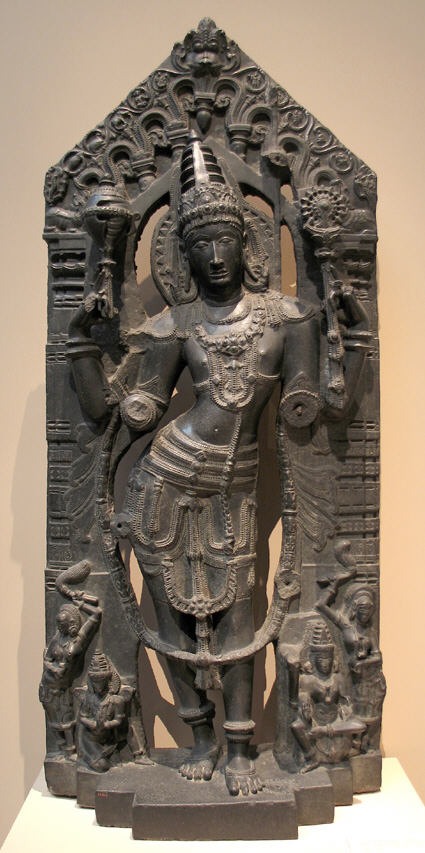
Vishnu with his mount, Garuda, his consort, Lakshmi, and attendants, 12-13th century, Kakatiya period. Kalyani region, Andhra Pradesh, India

Much of the information about the Kakatiya period comes from inscriptions, including around 1,000 stone inscriptions, and 12 copper-plate inscriptions. Most of these inscriptions document matters relating to religion, such as donations to Hindu temples. They are particularly abundant for the period 1175–1324 CE, which is the period when the dynasty flourished. The probability is that many inscriptions have been lost due to buildings falling into ruin and the destruction of these inscriptions caused by subsequent rulers, most notably the Mughal Empire in the Telangana region. Nevertheless, inscriptions are still being discovered today, but governmental agencies tend to concentrate on recording the information of those that have previously been discovered rather than placing their efforts into discovering and uncovering potential inscriptions.

Information about the Kakatiya period also comes from Sanskrit and Telugu literary works written during Kakatiya and post-Kakatiya period. The most notable among these works include Prataparudriyam, Krida-bhiramamu, Panditaradhya-charitamu, Sivayogasaramu, Nitisara, Niti-sastra-muktavali, Nrutya-ratnavali, Pratapa-charita, Siddhesvara-charitra, Somadeva-rajiyamu, Palnativira-charitra, Velugotivari-vamsavali, and Velugotivari-vamsacharitra. Chronicles by Muslim authors such as Isami and Firishta describe Prataparudra's defeats against the Muslim armies. The Kannada text Kumara-Ramana-charita also provides information about Prataparudra's relations with the Kampili kingdom.

Besides epigraphs and literature, the forts, temples and tanks constructed during the Kakatiya period are an important source of information about contemporary society, art and architecture.

== History ==
=== Origin ===
The Kakatiya rulers traced their ancestry to a legendary chief or ruler named Durjaya. Many other ruling dynasties of Andhra also claimed descent from Durjaya. Nothing further is known about this chief.

Most of the Kakatiya records do not mention the varna (social class) of the family, but the majority of the ones that do, proudly describe them as Shudra. Examples include the Bothpur and Vaddamanu inscriptions of Ganapati's general Malyala Gunda senani. The Kakatiyas also maintained marital relations with other Shudra families, such as the Kotas and the Natavadi chiefs. This indicates that the Kakatiyas were likely of Shudra origin.

A few copper-plate inscriptions of the Kakatiya family describe them as belonging to the Kshatriya (warrior) varna. These inscriptions primarily document grants to Brahmans, and appear to be inspired by the genealogies of the Imperial Cholas. For example, the Motupalli inscription of Ganapati counts legendary solar dynasty kings such as Rama among the ancestors of Durjaya, the progenitor of the Kakatiya family. The Malkapuram inscription of Visvesvara Sivacharya, the preceptor of Kakatiya rulers Ganapati Deva and Rudrama Devi, also connects the Kakatiyas to the solar dynasty (Sūryavaṃsa). The term "Kshatriya" in these panegyric records appears to signify the family's warrior-like qualities rather than their actual varna.

=== Relationship to the Rashtrakutas ===
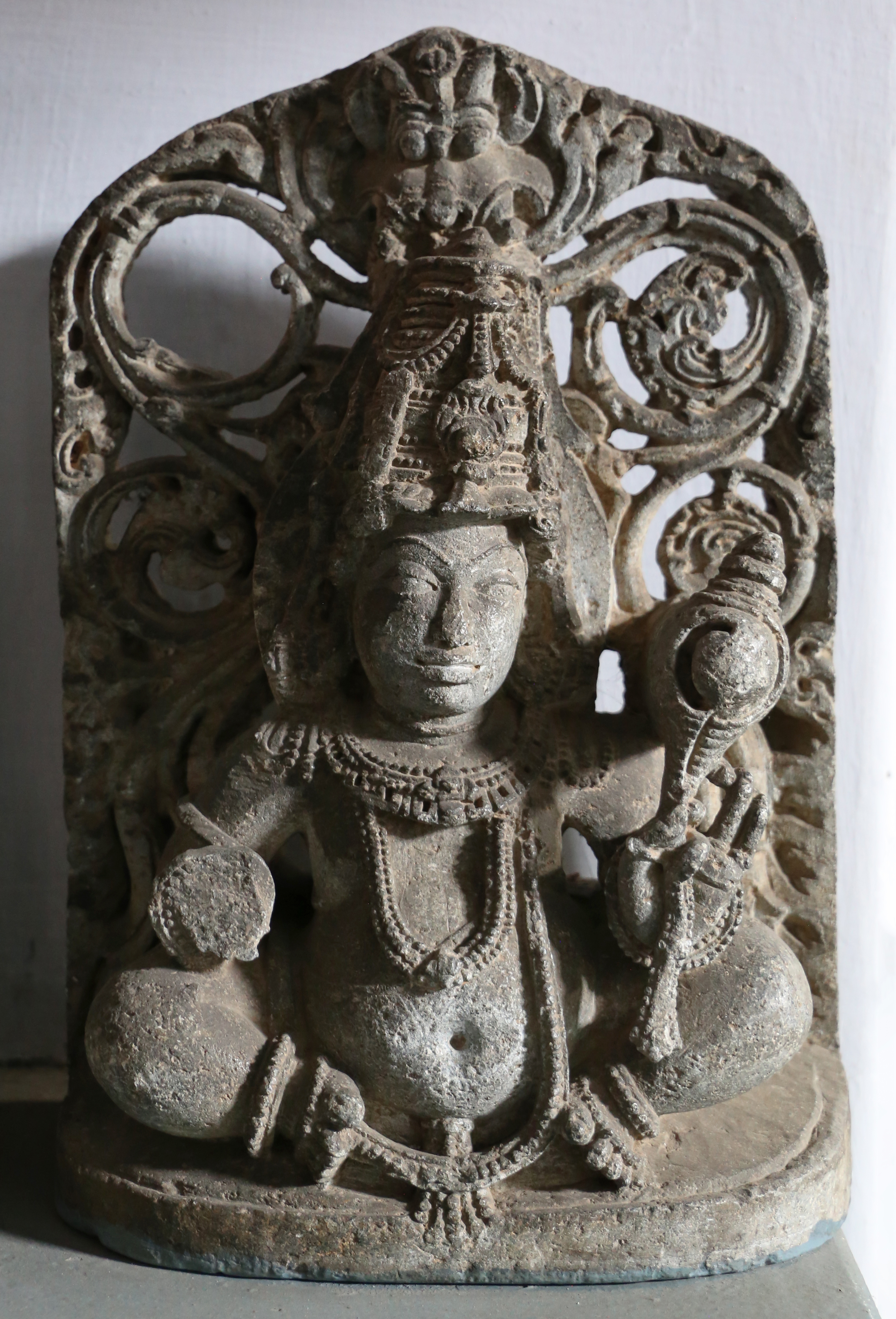
Kubera, Hoysala-Kakatiya period, 1100-1350 CE.

According to an interpretation of the Mangallu and the Bayyaram inscriptions, the Kakatiyas were not just Rashtrakuta vassals, but also a branch of the Rashtrakuta family.

The 956 CE Mangallu inscription was issued by the Vengi Chalukya prince Dānārnava, at the request of the Kakatiya chief Gunda IV. The inscription names Gundyana's ancestors as Gundiya-Rashtrakuta (Gunda III) and Eriya-Rashtrakuta (Erra). This suggests that Gunda IV was a Rashtrakuta general, and not a Vengi Chalukya subordinate, as assumed by earlier historians.

The Bayyaram tank inscription, which records the construction of the Dharma-kirti-samudra tank by Ganapati's sister Mailama (or Mailamba), provides another genealogical list. The similarities of names mentioned in the Mangallu and Bayyaram inscriptions lists indicate that both of these refer to the same family:

Genealogical list of early Kakatiyas
| Mangallu grant inscription | Bayyaram tank inscription |
|---|---|
| Kakatiya family | Durjaya family |
| | Venna-nripa |
| Gundiya Rashtrakuta | Gunda I |
| | Gunda II |
| | Gunda III |
| Eriya Rashtrakuta | Erra |
| Betiya (married Vandyanamba) | |
| Kakartya Gundyana | Pindi-Gunda (Gunda IV) |

The significance of the suffix "Rashtrakuta" in the names of the early Kakatiya chiefs is debated. According to one theory, the suffix only implies that these chiefs were Rashtrakuta's subordinates. This theory is based on the fact that the phrase Rashtrakuta-kutumbinah appears in several Rashtrakuta-era copper-plate inscriptions, and refers to the officers and subjects of the Rashtrakuta kingdom.

According to another theory, the suffix implies that the Kakatiyas were a branch of the Rashtrakuta family because the term Rashtrakuta-kutumbinah was used for officers employed by the Rashtrakuta administration, not feudatory chiefs: the early records of the Kakatiya chiefs describe them as samantas (feudatory chiefs). The Kazipet Darga inscription of Durgaraja states that his father Beta II was born in the family of Samanta Viṣṭi. Historian P.V.P. Sastry theorises that "Viṣṭi" is a corruption of Vrishni, the name of a clan from which some Rashtrakutas claimed descent. He notes that some chiefs of Rashtrakuta origin adopted the title "Viṭṭi-narayana", which means "as great as Narayana (Krishna) of the Vitti (Vrishni) family. Sastry further proposes that the term "Voddi", which appears in the phrase Voddi-kula ("Voddi family") in the Mangallu inscription may be same as "Viṣṭi". Sastry also believes that the early Kakatiya chiefs followed Jainism, which was also patronized by the Rashtrakutas, thus strengthening the view that the two dynasties were connected (see Religion section below).

The Kakatiyas seemed to have adopted the mythical bird Garuda as their royal insignia, as attested by the Ekamranatha temple inscription of Ganapati-deva, the Palampet inscription of the Kakatiya general Recherla Rudra, and Vidyanatha's Prataparudriya. The Bayyaram tank inscription calls the Kakatiya chief Beta I (son of Gunda IV) Garudamka-Beta, and "Garuda" here appears to refer to the family's emblem. In Hindu mythology, Garuda is the vahana of god Vishnu. The Rashtrakutas and some other dynasties of Deccan claimed descent from the Vrishni clan (associated with Vishnu's avatar Krishna) and had adopted Garuda as their royal insignia. According to Sastry, this corroborates the theory that the Kakatiyas were associated with the Rashtrakuta family. Sastry further speculates that the Kakatiyas may have adopted the Garuda symbol because of Jain influence: the yaksha of the Jain tirthankara Shantinatha is represented by the Garuda symbol. However, when the Kakatiyas switched their allegiance to the Chalukyas of Kalyani, they also adopted the varaha symbol used by the Chalukyas.

Based on Ganapati-deva's Garavapadu inscription, which names Karikala Chola among the family's ancestors, epigraphist C.R.K. Charlu theorised that the Kakatiyas were a branch of the Telugu Chodas. However, no other Kakatiya record mentions Karikala, and unlike the Telugu Chodas, the Kakatiyas did not claim to belong to the Kashyapa-gotra. Therefore, Sastry dismisses Charlu's theory as untenable.

=== Early feudatory chiefs ===
The regnal years of the early members of the Kakatiya family are not certain. The earliest known Kakatiya chief is Venna or Vanna (r. c. 800-815), who claimed descent from Durjaya, legendary chieftain of ancient Andhra. According to Kakatiya inscriptions, he ruled from a town called Kakati, because of which his family was called Kakatishas ("lords of Kakati"). Not much is known about his successors Gunda I and Gunda II, who ruled during c. 815-865 CE. The Bayyaram tank inscription compares his successors - Gunda I, Gunda II, and Gunda III - to the three Ramas (Parashurama, Dasharatha-Rama, and Balarama).

The c. 956 CE Mangallu inscription suggests that the Kakatiyas came to the Telugu-speaking region as commanders of the Rashtrakuta armies. The earliest of these was Venna's son Gunda III, who died during Krishna II's invasion of the Vengi Chalukya kingdom around 895 CE. Krishna II captured the Kurravadi (possibly present-day Kuravi) region from the Vengi Chalukyas, and probably appointed Gunda III's son Erra as a governor there. Not much is known about Erra's son Betiya.

As a Rashtrakuta vassal, Betiya's son Gunda IV (r. c. 955-995) helped the Vengi Chalukya prince Danarnava ascend the throne after a succession dispute. In 973 CE, after the collapse of the Rashtrakuta empire and the murder of Danarnava, he attempted to carve out an independent principality at Kuravi. The Mudugonda Chalukyas, whom he had displaced from Kuravi, sought help from the Kalyani Chalukyas, who had usurped the power from the Rashtrakutas. The Kalyani Chalukya forces probably defeated and killed Gunda IV. His son Beta I (r. c. 1000-1052 CE) accepted the Kalyani Chalukya suzerainty and received from them the fief of Anumakonda (modern Hanamakonda), which later became the Kakatiya capital. He distinguished himself in the Chalukya campaigns against the Cholas, during the reign of Someshvara I.

Prola I (r. c. 1052-1076), the son of Beta I, participated in various Chalukya military campaigns, consolidated the Kakatiya control around Anumakonda by defeating local chiefs, and obtained Anumakonda as a hereditary fief. The Chalukya king granted his son Beta II (r. c. 996-1051) the Sabbi-1000 province (the historical Sabbi-nadu region with 1000 villages, centred around Vemulavada). He was succeeded by his sons, first Durga-raja and then Prola II (r. c. 1116–1157).

After the decline of the Rashtrakuta power, the Kakatiyas served as vassals of the Kalyani Chalukyas. After the decline of the Chalukya power in the 12th century, they assumed sovereignty by suppressing other Chalukya subordinates in the Telangana region.

=== As sovereigns ===
==== Prataparudra I ====
Location of the Kakatiyas and neighbouring South Asian polities in 1175, on the eve of the Ghurid Empire invasion of the subcontinent.

The 1149 Sanigaram inscription of Prola II is the last known record of the Kakatiyas as vassals. The 1163 Anumakonda inscription of Rudradeva alias Prataparudra I is the earliest known record that describes the Kakatiyas as a sovereign power.

According to Sastry, Prataparudra I reigned between around 1158 – 1195, while Sircar gives the dates 1163–1195. He was also known as Rudra Deva, Kakatiya Rudradeva, Venkata, and Venkataraya He was the son of Prola II, who had made efforts to assert greater Kakatiya influence on territories in the eastern parts of the declining Western Chalukyan empire and who died in a battle fought against the Velanati Choda ruler Gonka II around 1157/1158 while doing so. It was during Prataparudra's reign, in 1163, that the Kakatiyas declared an end to their status as feudatory chiefs of the Chalukyas. (Note: Talbot (2001, p. 128): "Soon after he came to power, Rudradeva had the Thousand Pillared temple built in Hanamkonda, then the Kakatiya capital. The Sanskrit inscription recording its foundation in 1163 contains an elaborate genealogy of Rudradeva's ancestry... Since it was the earliest of Rudradeva's inscriptions to omit any mention of the Chalukya dynasty of Kalyani, we can assume that the construction of the temple was meant to mark Rudradeva's new status as an overlord in his own right.") It is notable that inscriptions were henceforth written using the Kakatiya chiefs' vernacular Telugu rather than the Kannada language that had prevailed until that point.

Mahadeva succeeded Prataparudra I as king, reigning probably from 1195 to 1199.

==== Ganapati ====
Just as the Yadava and Hoysala dynasties took control of linguistically related areas during the 13th century, so too did the Kakatiyas under the rule of Ganapati. He is also known as Ganapathi Deva and, according to Sastry, reigned between 1199 and 1262; Sircar gives regnal dates of 1199–1260. He significantly expanded Kakatiya lands during the 1230s when he launched a series of attacks outside the dynasty's traditional Telangana region and thus brought under Kakatiya control the Telugu-speaking lowland delta areas around the Godavari and Krishna rivers. The outcome in the case of all three dynasties, says historian Richard Eaton, was that they "catalysed processes of supralocal identity formation and community building".

The Kakatiya capital at Orugallu, established in 1195, was not forgotten while Ganapati expanded his territory. He organised the building of a massive granite wall around the city, complete with ramps designed for ease of access to its ramparts from within. A moat and numerous bastions were also constructed.

Ganapati was keen to bolster the dynasty's economy. He encouraged merchants to trade abroad, abolishing all taxes except for a fixed duty and supporting those who risked their lives to travel afar. He created the man-made Pakhal Lake.

==== Rudrama Devi ====
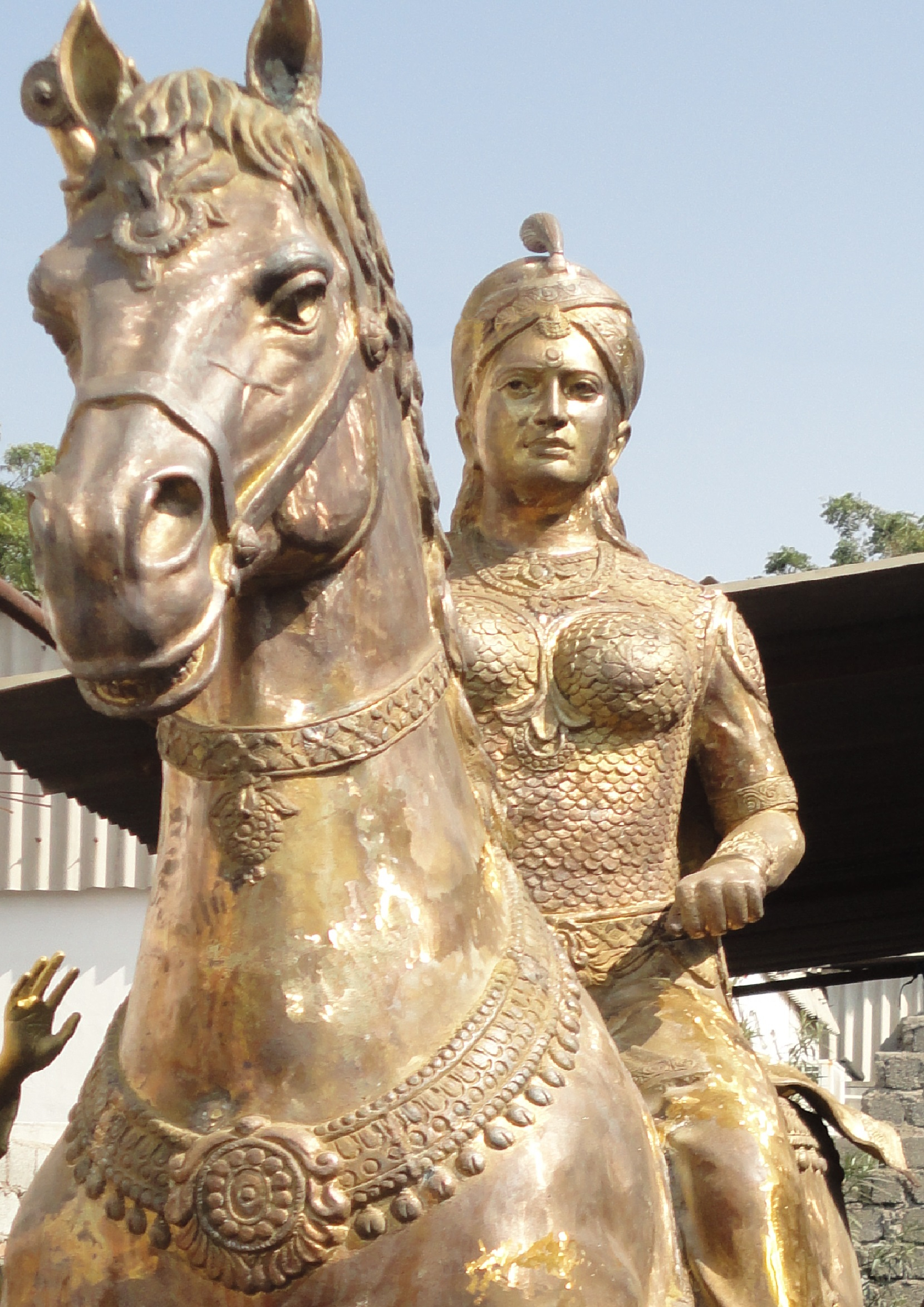
Statue of Rudrama Devi.

Rudrama Devi, also known as Rudramadevi, reigned around 1262–1289 CE (alternative dates: 1261–1295 CE) and is one of the few queens in Indian history. Sources disagree regarding whether she was the widow of Ganapati or his daughter.

Marco Polo, who visited India probably sometime around 1289–1293, made note of Rudrama Devi's rule and nature in flattering terms. (Note: Marco Polo referred to the kingdom as Mutfili, which was the name for the area around a major port of the dynasty, now known as Masulipatnam.(Chakravarti 1991)) She continued the planned fortification of the capital, raising the height of Ganapati's wall as well as adding a second earthen curtain wall 1.5 miles (2.4 km) in diameter and with an additional 150 feet (46 m)-wide moat.

A fragmentary Kannada language inscription also states that the Kakatiya general Bhairava defeated the Yadava army probably in or after 1263 CE, which may be a reference to his repulsion of Mahadeva's invasion. A coin of Mahadeva bears the Kakatiya emblem varaha with the Yadava symbols; this varaha may have been stuck on Mahadeva's coins to mark the Kakatiya victory.

Rudrama was married to Virabhadra, an Eastern Chalukyan prince of Nidadavolu who had been selected for that purpose by her father. Having no son as an heir, Rudrama abdicated in favour of her grandson when it became apparent that the expansionist sultan Alauddin Khalji was encroaching on the Deccan and might in due course attack the Kakatiyas.

==== Prataparudra II ====
The earliest biography of Rudrama Devi's successor, Prataparudra II, is the Prataparudra Caritramu, dating from the 16th century. His reign began in 1289 (alternative date: 1295) and ended with the demise of the dynasty in 1323. It is described by Eaton as the "first chapter in a larger story" that saw the style of polity in the Deccan change from being regional kingdoms to transregional sultanates that survived until the arrival of the British East India Company in the 18th century.

=== Decline ===
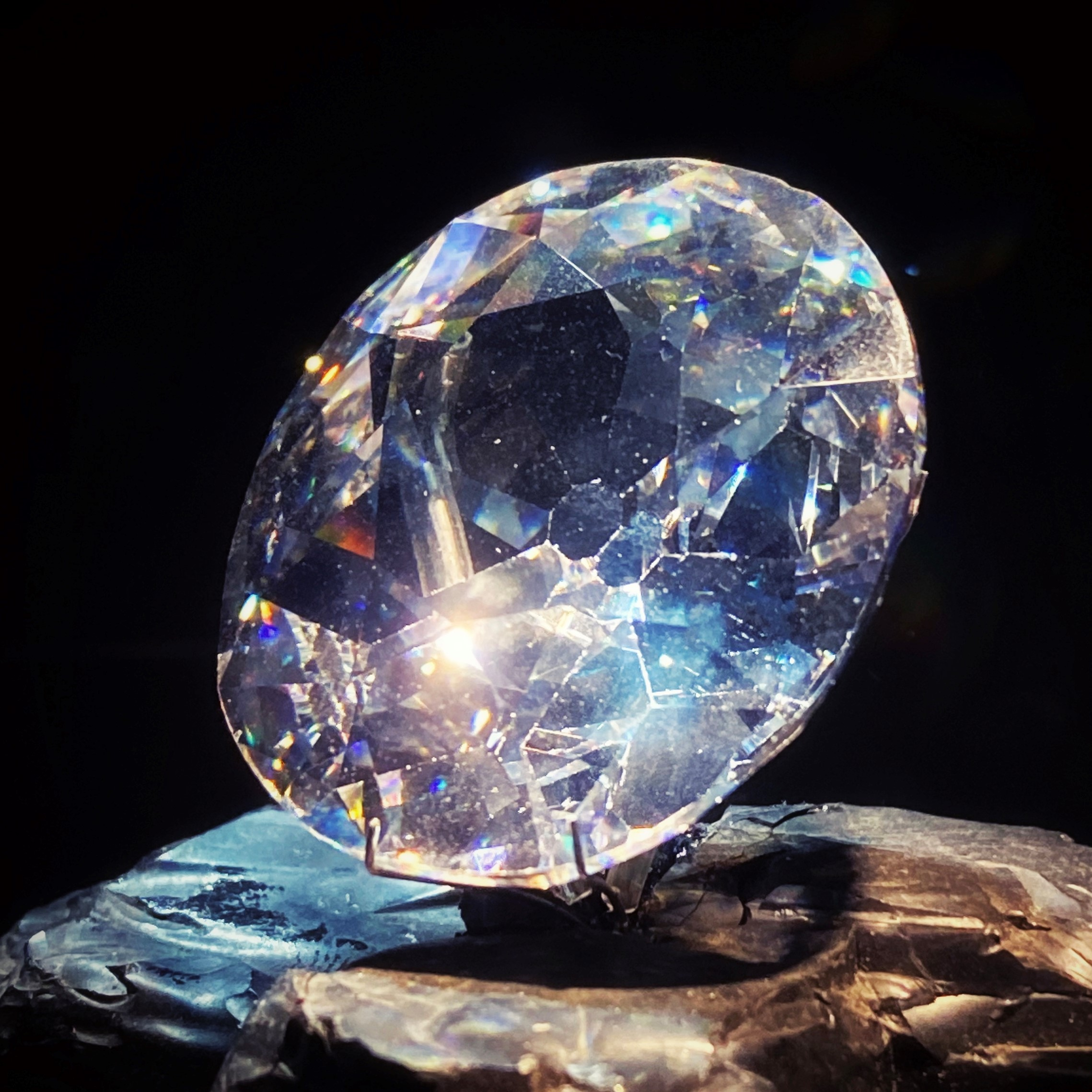
A replica of the Koh-i-Noor diamond. The diamond was originally owned by the Kakatiya dynasty.

The Kakatiya kingdom attracted the attention of the Delhi Sultanate ruler Alauddin Khalji because of the possibility of plunder. The first foray into the Kakatiya kingdom was made in 1303 by Malik Chajju, the nephew of the Indian Muslim Wazir Nusrat Khan Jalesari of Delhi, and Fakhruddin Jauna, which was a disaster due to the resistance of the Kakatiya army in the Battle of Upparapalli. (Note: Sharma (1957, p. 234): "Vennama, the son of Dāma, led his troops in a defeat of the Turks very probably during Ala-ud-din Khalji's first invasion of Telangana in 1303. This success against the Turkish arms took place in the battle of Upparapalli, where Potuganti Maili is said to have put the enemies to flight.") In 1309 the Gujarati general, Malik Kafur, in an attempt to force Prataparudra into acceptance of a position subordinate to the sultanate at Delhi. Kafur organised a month-long siege of Orugallu that ended with success in February 1310. Prataparudra was forced to make various symbolic acts of obeisance designed to demonstrate his new position as a subordinate but, as was Alauddin's plan, he was not removed as ruler of the area but rather forced thereafter to pay annual tribute to Delhi. It was probably at this time that the Koh-i-Noor diamond passed from Kakatiya ownership to that of Alauddin, along with 20,000 horses and 100 elephants.

In 1311, Prataparudra formed a part of the sultanate forces that attacked the Pandyan empire in the south, and he took advantage of that situation to quell some of his vassals in Nellore who had seen his reduced status as an opportunity for independence. Later, though, in 1318, he failed to provide the annual tribute to Delhi, claiming that the potential for being attacked on the journey made it impossible. The succeeding Sultan Mubarak Shah responded by sending another of his Gujarati generals, Khusrau Khan, to Orugallu with a force that bristled with technology previously unknown in the area, including trebuchet-like machines. Prataparudra had to submit once more, with his obeisance on this occasion being arranged by the sultanate to include a very public display whereby he bowed towards Delhi from the ramparts of Orugallu. The amount of his annual tribute was changed, becoming 100 elephants and 12,000 horses.

The new arrangements did not last long. Taking advantage of a revolution in Delhi that saw the Khalji dynasty removed and Ghiyasuddin Tughlaq installed as sultan, Prataparudra again asserted his independence in 1320. Tughlaq sent his son, Jauna Khan, to defeat the defiant Kakatiya king in 1321. Khan's army was riven with internal dissension due to rumours of the king's death, which caused many officers to leave the army. This caused the siege on this occasion to last much longer — six months, rather than the few weeks that had previously been the case. The attackers were initially repulsed and Khan's forces retreated to regroup in Devagiri. Prataparudra celebrated the apparent victory by opening up his grain stores for public feasting. Khan returned in 1323 with his revitalised and reinforced army and, with few supplies left, Prataparudra was forced into submission after a five-month siege. The unprepared and battle-weary army of Orugallu was finally defeated, and Orugallu was renamed Sultanpur. It seems probable, from combining various contemporary and near-contemporary accounts, that Prataparudra committed suicide near the Narmada River while being taken as a prisoner to Delhi.

== Characterization ==
=== Geography ===
The Kakatiya base was the city of Orugallu in the dry uplands of northern Telangana on the Deccan Plateau. From there they expanded their influence into Coastal Andhra, the delta between the Godavari and Krishna rivers that feed into the Bay of Bengal. According to Rao and Shulman, the latter contained a high proportion of Brahmins while the former was the haunt of "peasants, artisans and warriors". Under the Kakatiyas, cultural innovation often began in the uplands, was refined in the lowlands and then recycled back into the Deccan. This bi-directional flow of cultural influences brought into being a feeling of cultural affinity between those who spoke the Telugu language where nothing of that nature had previously existed. (Note: The term andhra bhasa, meaning language of Andhra, appeared as a synonym for the Telugu language at least as early as 1053 and suggests an emerging correlation of linguistics and geography. (Eaton 2005, p. 13) The linguistic mapping of regions of India continued to the present day and formed a part of the States Reorganisation Act, 1956.) The unification of the distinct upland and lowland cultures was their most significant political achievement, achieved through a process of binding many locally powerful figures in allegiance to the empire.

The area of land under Kakatiya control reached its zenith around the 13th century CE during the rule of Ganapati Deva. By this time, South India and the Deccan were essentially under the aegis of four Hindu monarchies, of which the Kakatiyas were one. (Note: Aside from the Kakatiyas, the dominant Hindu monarchies in South India and the Deccan around the 13th century CE were the Yadavas, the Hoysalas and the Pandyas. The Yadavas, Hoysalas and Kakatiyas had carved up what had been the area controlled by the Western Chalukya Empire, while the Pandyas controlled lands formerly under the Chola Empire.(Ventakaramanayya 1942, p. 1)) The four dynasties were in a constant state of warfare with each other, with the Kakatiyas eventually exercising control from close to Anagondi in the west to Kalyani in the north-east, and down to Kanei and Ganjam district in southern Orissa.

=== Architecture ===
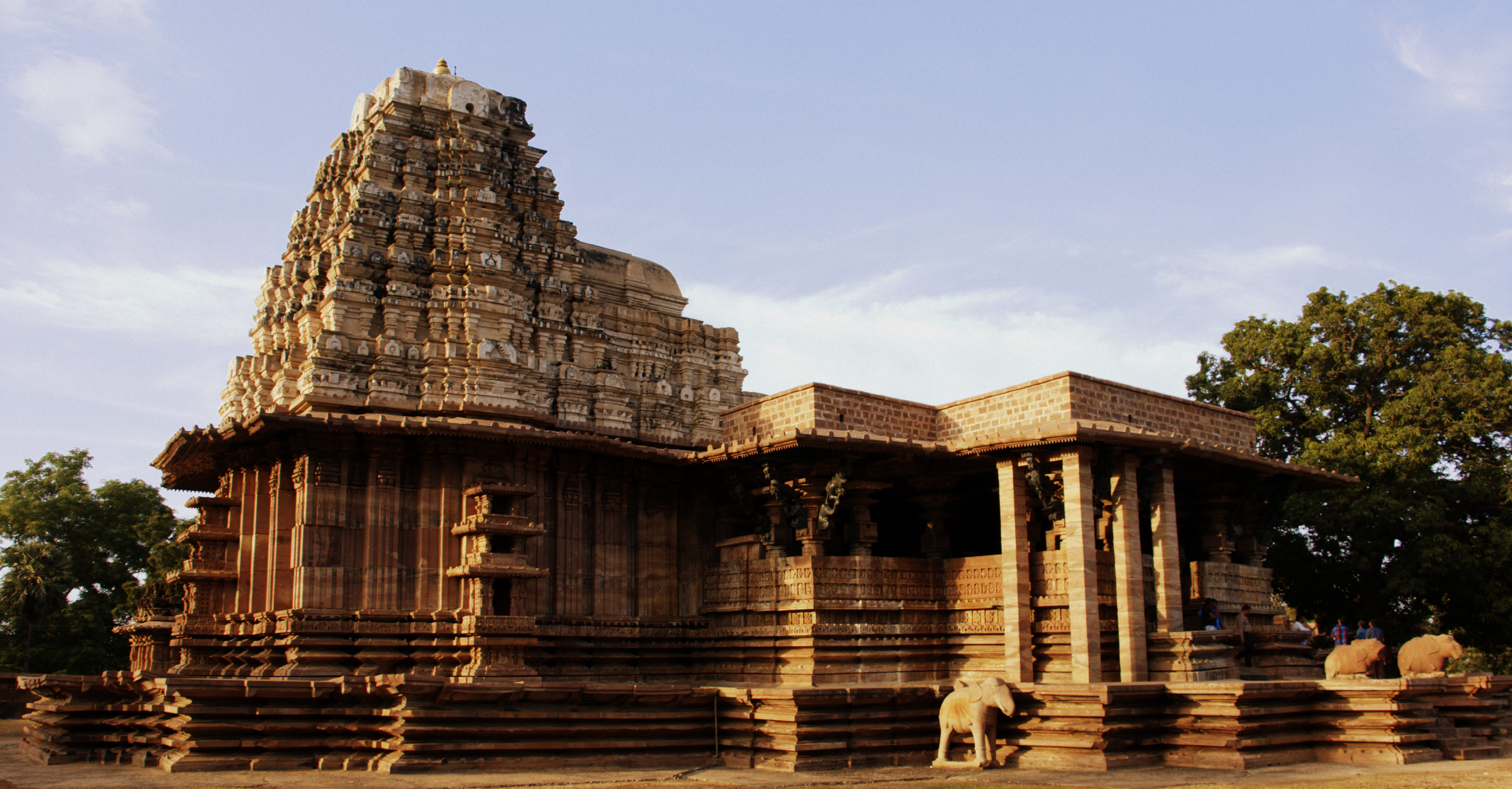
13th century Ramappa Temple in Telangana.

A notable trend during the dynastic period was the construction of reservoirs for irrigation in the uplands, around 5000 of which were built by warrior families subordinate to the Kakatiyas. This dramatically altered the possibilities for development in the sparsely populated dry areas. Many of these edifices, often called "tanks", including the large examples at Pakala and Ramappa, are still used today.

Another notable architectural feature of the dynasty relates to temples. Even before the arrival of the dynasty, there were large, well-established and well-endowed Hindu places of worship in the relatively populous delta areas; however, the temples of the uplands, which were smaller and less cosmopolitan in origin and funding, did not exist until the Kakatiya period. In the lowlands, where Brahmins were numerous, the temples had long benefited from a desire to build social networks for the purposes of domestic and foreign trade, as well as for obtaining grazing rights in the face of competition; in the uplands, the endowment of the buildings was often associated with the construction and continued maintenance of reservoirs and enabled a different type of networking based on political hierarchies. The strengthening of those hierarchies, which was achieved in part by donating land for the temples and then attending worship, was necessary as the inland agrarian society grew rapidly in number and location.

=== Society ===
There is a disparity between the analysis of inscriptions, of which the work of Cynthia Talbot has been in the vanguard and the traditional works of Vedic Hinduism that described pre-colonial India in terms of a reverent and static society that was subject to the strictures of the caste system. Colonial British administrators found much that appealed to them in the latter works but the Kakatiya inscriptions of Andhra Pradesh, which depict a far wider range of society and events, suggest that the reality was far more fluid and very different from the idealised image.

Caste itself seems to have been of low importance as a social identifier. There was a lack of consistency regarding the varna rank of Kakatiyas. In most of their inscriptions, no varna affiliation was specified. In the case of a few where it was specified, they were mostly recorded to have been shudras. A handful of the inscriptions however tried to portray them as Kshatriyas. (Note: Talbot (2001, p. 51): "An inscription reads: `The Kakatiya dynasty, praised by the entire world and belonging to the fourth varna, then came into existence. In it was born the king named Prola, who was renowned for being exceedingly judicious.'... [In a handful of inscriptions], the Kakatiyas are linked with the solar dynasty of the ancient kshatriyas, stemming from Ikshvaku through Dasharatha and Rama... The lack of consistency regarding the varna rank of the Kakatiya dynasty is noteworthy, as is the fact that their Kshatriya claims were put forth primarily in documents associated with gifts to brahmans.") Anyone, regardless of birth, could acquire the nayaka title to denote warrior status and this they did. There is also little evidence that Kakatiya society paid much regard to caste identities, in the sense of jāti. Although occupation does appear to have been an important designator of social position, the inscriptions suggest that people were not bound to an occupation by birth.

The population became more settled in geographic terms. The growth of an agricultural peasant class subsumed many tribal people who previously had been nomadic. The nexus of politics and military was a significant feature of the era, and the Kakatiya recruitment of peasants into the military did much to create a new warrior class, develop social mobility and to extend the influence of the dynasty into areas of its kingdom that previously would have been untouched. The Kakatiya kings, and in particular the last two, encouraged an egalitarian ethos. The entrenched landed nobility that had existed before the dynasty found its power to be on the wane; the royal gifting of lands formerly in the possession of nobles to people of lesser status did much to effect this dilution.

== Religion ==
Historian P.V.P. Sastry theorizes that the early Kakatiya chiefs were followers of Jainism. A story in the Siddhesvara-charita states that Madhavavarman, an ancestor of the Kakatiyas, obtained military strength by the grace of goddess Padmāvatī or Padmakshi. The 1123 Govindapuram Jain inscription of Polavasa, another family of feudatory chiefs, contains a similar account of how their ancestor Madhavavarman obtained military strength by the grace of the Jain goddess Yakshesvari.

According to tradition, Prola II was initiated into Shaivism by the Kalamukha preceptor Ramesvara Pandita, and established Shaivism as his family's religion. The Shaivism-affiliated personal names of the later Kakatiya kings (such as Rudra, Mahadeva, Harihara, and Ganapati) also indicate a shift towards Shaivism. This, according to Sastry, strengthens the theory that the early Kakatiya chiefs were Jains.

== Genealogy ==
The following members of the Kakatiya family are known from epigraphic evidence. The rulers are children of their predecessors unless otherwise specified.

=== Feudatory chiefs ===
- Nripa Venna, born in the family of Durjaya (r. c. 800-815)
- Gunda I (r. c. 815-?)
- Gunda II (r. c. ?-865)
- Gunda III (died before 900)
- Nripati Erra
- Betiya
- Nripati Gunda IV alias Pindi-Gunda (r. c. 955-995)
- Nripati Beta I alias Garuda Beta (r. c. 996-1051)
- Prola I (r. c. 1052-1076)
- Beta II alias Tribhuvanamalla (r. c. 1076-1108)
- Durgaraja alias Tribhuvanamalla (r. c. 1108-1116), son of Beta II
- Prola II (r. c. 1116-1157), son of Beta II, married Muppama
  - His children included Rudra, Mahadeva, Harihara, Ganapati and Repolla Durga

=== Sovereign rulers ===
- Rudra (r. c. 1158-1195), son of Prola II, became a sovereign Tughlaq'sin 1163
- Mahadeva (r. c. 1196-1199), son of Prola II, married Bayyama
  - Had three children, including Ganapati-deva, Mailamba, and Kundamba
- Ganapati-deva (r. c. 1199-1262), married Somala-devi
  - Had two children, including Ganapamba (married Kota Beta) and Rudrama-devi
- Rudrama-devi (r. c. 1262-1289), married Chalukya Virabhadra
  - Had three children, including Mummadamba (married Kakati Mahadeva), Rudrama (married Yadava prince Ellana-deva), and Ruyyama (married Induluri Annaya-mantri)
- Prataparudra-deva (r. c. 1289-1323), son of Mummadamba, tributary to the Delhi Sultanate at times

== Legacy ==
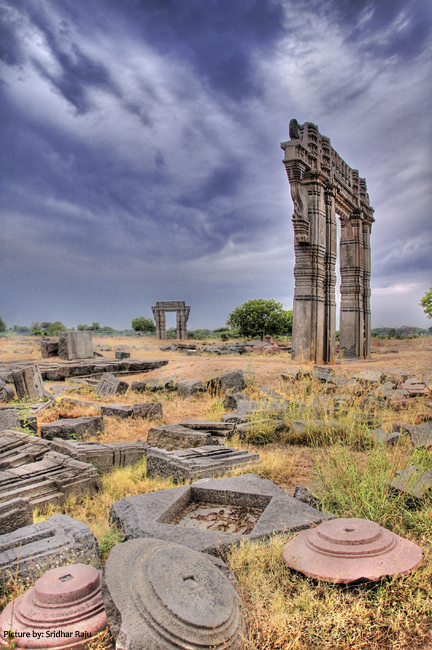
Ruins of the Kakatiya Kala Thoranam (Warangal Gate).

Tughlaq's control of the area lasted only for around a decade. The fall of the Kakatiya dynasty resulted in both political and cultural disarray because of both disparate resistance to the sultanate and dissension within it. The structure of the Kakatiya polity disintegrated and their lands soon fell under the control of numerous families from communities such as the Reddies and Velamas. As early as 1330, Musunuri Nayaks who served as army chiefs for Kakatiya kingdom united the various Telugu clans and recovered Warangal from the Delhi Sultanate and ruled for half a century. Surrounded by more significant states, by the 15th century these new entities had ceded to the Bahamani Sultanate and the Sangama dynasty, the latter of which evolved to become the Vijayanagara Empire.

A brother of Prataparudra II, Annamaraja, has been associated with ruling what eventually became the princely state of Bastar during the British Raj period. This appears likely to be historical revisionism, dating from a genealogy published by the ruling family in 1703, because it records only eight generations spanning almost four centuries of rule. Such revisionism and tenuous claims of connection to the Kakatiyas were not uncommon because it was perceived as legitimising the right to rule and warrior status. Talbot notes that there is a record of a brother called Annamadeva and that:

He is said to have left [Orugallu] for the northeast after anointing Prataparudra's son as king. Thus, the founder of the family fortunes in Bastar may very well have been a Telugu warrior from Telangana who was familiar with the prevalent legends about the Kakatiyas.

According to Talbot and Eaton, a revisionist interpretation of Prataparudra II himself appeared much sooner, within a few years of his death, and for broadly similar reasons. A stone inscription dated 1330 mentions a Prolaya Nayaka, who was said to have restored order, as in Prataparudra days. He presented himself as a legitimate successor to Prataparudra, by portraying both of them as righteous monarchs, meanwhile reconstructing Prataparudra's life and career favourably. (Note: Chattopadhyaya (1998, pp. 57–58) quotes from the Vilasa grant of Prolaya Nayaka: "[W]hen Prataparudra of the Kakati family ruled, even such celebrated rulers of the past as Yayati, Nabhaga and Bhagiratha were completely forgotten."... "[W]hen the Sun, viz., Prataparudra set, the world was enveloped in the Turuska darkness. The evil (adharma), which he had up to that time kept under check, flourished under them, as the conditions were very favourable for its growth.") By 1420, Muslim rulers had become accommodated to the Deccan society, and strong dichotomies between Hindus and Muslims were no longer useful. Muslim rulers were no longer conceived as diametrically opposed to the figure of Prataparudra, but rather as rulers of equal status.

This type of revisionism, which Talbot describes as "social memories" and which persist to the present day, reappeared in the 16th century with the Prataparudra Caritramu hagiography, which claimed him to be the founder of the Padmanayaka class of Telugu warriors and provided the elite of the Vijayanagara empire with what Talbot has described as a "charter of legitimacy". This work claimed, contrary to all reasonable evidence, that he did not die after being taken prisoner but instead met with the sultan, was recognised as being an avatar of Shiva, and was allowed to return to Orugallu. Once back home, the Prataparudra Caritamu says, he released the Padmanayakas from their allegiance to him and told them to become independent kings. The work also claims Vijayanagara to be an ally of Prataparudra, which is clearly anachronistic but served the purpose of elevating the role of the Paadmanayakas, whom it claimed to be ultimately subordinate to Vijayanagara during his time.

== See also ==
- Ramappa Temple
- Kakatiya Kala Thoranam

== Bibliography ==
- Asher, Catherine B.; Talbot, Cynthia, eds. (2006), "The expansion of Turkic power, 1180–1350", India before Europe, Cambridge University Press, ISBN 978-0-52180-904-7
- Chakravarti, Ranabir (1991), "Horse Trade and Piracy at Tana (Thana, Maharashtra, India): Gleanings from Marco Polo", Journal of the Economic and Social History of the Orient, 34 (3): 159–182, doi:10.2307/3632243, JSTOR 3632243
- Chattopadhyaya, B. D. (1998), Representing the Other? Sanskrit Sources and the Muslims, New Delhi: Manohar, ISBN 978-8173042522
- Desai, V. R. M. (1962), "Savings in Ancient Hindu Polity", The Indian Journal of Political Science, 23 (1/4): 268–276, JSTOR 41853935
- Eaton, Richard M. (2005), A Social History of the Deccan: 1300–1761, Cambridge University Press, ISBN 978-0-52125-484-7
- Jackson, Peter (2003), The Delhi Sultanate: A Political and Military History (Reprinted ed.), Cambridge University Press, ISBN 978-0-52154-329-3
- Kalia, Ravi (1994), Bhubaneswar: From a Temple Town to a Capital City, Southern Illinois University Press
- Kulke, Hermann; Rothermund, Dietmar, eds. (2004) [1986], A History of India (4th ed.), Routledge, ISBN 978-0-41532-920-0
- Prasad, G. Durga (1988), History of the Andhras up to 1565 A. D., Guntur: P. G. Publishers
- Rao, S. Nagabhushan, ed. (1993). Cultural Heritage of the Kakatiyas: A Medieval Kingdom of South India. Warangal: District Council for Cultural Affairs.
- Rao, P. (1994), History and Culture of Andhra Pradesh, Sterling
- Rao, Velcheru Narayana (2003), "Court, Temple, and Public", in Pollock, Sheldon (ed.), Literary Cultures in History: Reconstructions from South Asia, University of California Press
- Rao, Velcheru Narayana; Shulman, David, eds. (2002), Classical Telugu Poetry: An Anthology, University of California Press
- Rao, Velcheru Narayana; Shulman, David (2012), Srinatha: The Poet Who Made Gods and Kings, Oxford University Press
- Rubiés, Joan-Pau (2000), Travel and Ethnology in the Renaissance: South India through European Eyes, 1250–1625, Cambridge University Press
- Sastry, P. V. Parabhrama (1978). N. Ramesan (ed.). The Kākatiyas of Warangal. Hyderabad: Government of Andhra Pradesh. OCLC 252341228.
- N. Venkataramanayya; P. V. P. Sastry (1957). "The Kākatīyas". In Sharma, R.S. (ed.). A Comprehensive history of India: A.D. 985–1206. Vol. 4 (Part 1) (1987 reprint ed.). Indian History Congress / People's Publishing House. ISBN 978-81-7007-121-1.
- Sircar, D. C. (1979), Some Epigraphical Records of the Medieval Period from Eastern India, Abhinav Publications, ISBN 978-8-17017-096-9
- Sircar, D. C. (2008) [1968], Studies in Indian Coins (Reprinted ed.), Motilal Banarsidass, ISBN 978-8-12082-973-2
- Subrahmanyam, Sanjay (1998), "Hearing Voices: Vignettes of Early Modernity in South Asia, 1400–1750", Daedalus, 127 (3): 75–104, JSTOR 20027508
- Suryanarayana, Kolluru (1986), History of the Minor Chaḷukya Families in Medieval Andhradesa, B. R. Publishing, ISBN 978-8-17018-330-3
- Talbot, Austin Cynthia (2001), Pre-colonial India in Practice: Society, Region, and Identity in Medieval Andhra, Oxford University Press, ISBN 978-0-19803-123-9
- Ventakaramanayya, N. (1942), The Early Muslim Expansion in South India, University of Madras
- Venkataramanayya, N.; Sarma, M. Somasekhara (1960). "The Kakatiyas of Warangal". In Yazdani, Ghulam (ed.). The Early History of the Deccan Parts VII–XI. Vol. VIII: Yādavas of Seuṇadeśa. Oxford University Press. ISBN 9788170691259. OCLC 59001459.

| Timeline and cultural period | Indus plain (Punjab-Sapta Sindhu-Gujarat) | Gangetic Plain | | | Central India | Southern India |
| Timeline and cultural period | Indus plain (Punjab-Sapta Sindhu-Gujarat) | Upper Gangetic Plain (Ganga-Yamuna doab) | Middle Gangetic Plain | Lower Gangetic Plain | Central India | Southern India |
IRON AGE
| Culture | Late Vedic Period | Late Vedic Period; Painted Grey Ware culture | Late Vedic Period; Northern Black Polished Ware | | Pre-history | |
| 6th century BCE | Gandhara | Kuru-Panchala | Magadha | | Adivasi (tribes) | Assaka |
| Culture | Persian-Greek influences | "Second Urbanisation"; Rise of Shramana movements Jainism - Buddhism - Ājīvika - Yoga | | | Pre-history | |
| 5th century BCE | (Persian conquests) | | Shaishunaga dynasty | | Adivasi (tribes) | Assaka |
| 4th century BCE | (Greek conquests) | Nanda empire | | | | |
HISTORICAL AGE
| Culture | Spread of Buddhism | | | | Pre-history | |
| 3rd century BCE | Maurya Empire | | | | | Satavahana dynasty Sangam period (300 BCE – 200 CE); Early Cholas; Early Pandyan kingdom Cheras |
| Culture | Preclassical Hinduism (Note: Michaels (2004) p.39) - "Hindu Synthesis" (Note: Hiltebeitel (2002)) (ca. 200 BCE - 300 CE) (Note: Michaels (2004) p.39) (Note: Hiltebeitel (2002)); Epics - Puranas - Ramayana - Mahabharata - Bhagavad Gita - Brahma Sutras - Smarta Tradition; Mahayana Buddhism | | | | | |
| 2nd century BCE | Indo-Greek Kingdom | | Shunga Empire; Maha-Meghavahana Dynasty | | | Satavahana dynasty Sangam period (300 BCE – 200 CE); Early Cholas; Early Pandyan kingdom Cheras |
| 1st century BCE | Indo-Greek Kingdom | | Shunga Empire; Maha-Meghavahana Dynasty | | | Satavahana dynasty Sangam period (300 BCE – 200 CE); Early Cholas; Early Pandyan kingdom Cheras |
| 1st century CE | Indo-Scythians; Indo-Parthians | | Kuninda Kingdom | | | Satavahana dynasty Sangam period (300 BCE – 200 CE); Early Cholas; Early Pandyan kingdom Cheras |
| 2nd century | Kushan Empire | | | | | Satavahana dynasty Sangam period (300 BCE – 200 CE); Early Cholas; Early Pandyan kingdom Cheras |
| 3rd century | Kushano-Sasanian Kingdom; Western Satraps | Kushan Empire | | Kamarupa kingdom | Adivasi (tribes) | Satavahana dynasty Sangam period (300 BCE – 200 CE); Early Cholas; Early Pandyan kingdom Cheras |
| Culture | "Golden Age of Hinduism"(ca. CE 320-650) (Note: Michaels (2004) p.40); Puranas - Kural; Co-existence of Hinduism and Buddhism | | | | | |
| 4th century | Kidarites | Gupta Empire; Varman dynasty | | | | Andhra Ikshvakus; Kalabhra dynasty Kadamba Dynasty; Western Ganga Dynasty |
| 5th century | Hephthalite Empire | Alchon Huns | | | | Vishnukundina; Kalabhra dynasty |
| 6th century | Nezak Huns; Kabul Shahi; Maitraka | | | | Adivasi (tribes) | Vishnukundina; Badami Chalukyas; Kalabhra dynasty |
| Culture | Late-Classical Hinduism (ca. CE 650-1100) (Note: Michaels (2004) p.41); Advaita Vedanta - Tantra; Decline of Buddhism in India | | | | | |
| 7th century | Indo-Sassanids | | Vakataka dynasty Empire of Harsha | Mlechchha dynasty | Adivasi (tribes) | Badami Chalukyas; Eastern Chalukyas; Pandyan kingdom (revival); Pallava |
| 7th century | Karkota dynasty | | | | Adivasi (tribes) | |
| 8th century | Kabul Shahi | Pala Empire | | | Adivasi (tribes) | Eastern Chalukyas; Pandyan kingdom Kalachuri |
| 9th century | Gurjara-Pratihara | | | | Adivasi (tribes) | Rashtrakuta Empire; Eastern Chalukyas; Pandyan kingdom Medieval Cholas; Chera Perumals of Makkotai |
| 10th century | Ghaznavids | | | Pala dynasty Kamboja-Pala dynasty | Adivasi (tribes) | Kalyani Chalukyas; Eastern Chalukyas; Medieval Cholas; Chera Perumals of Makkotai; Rashtrakuta |
References and sources for table References Sources: Flood, Gavin D. (1996), An Introduction to Hinduism, Cambridge University Press; Hiltebeitel, Alf (2002), Hinduism. In: Joseph Kitagawa, "The Religious Traditions of Asia: Religion, History, and Culture", Routledge; Michaels, Axel (2004), Hinduism. Past and present, Princeton, New Jersey: Princeton University Press
