= Chirumarri =

- Village
- Location within Telangana
- Coordinates: 17.16487°N 80.02712°E
- Country: India
- State: Telangana
- District: Khammam district
- Assembly constituency: Madhira

Population (Census 2011)
  - Total: 2,498
- Post code: 507158

Chirumarri is a village in Mudigonda Mandal in Khammam District.

== Geography ==
Chirumarri is located at 17.16487°N 80.02712°E. along Mudigonda- Vallabhi road, 6 km from Mudigonda and 14 km from Khammam.

== Demographics ==
According to Indian census 2011, village consists of 612 households with a population of 2,498, consisting of 1,292 males 1,206 females.
