= Banapuram =

- village
- Location Telangana, India Banapuram (India)
- Coordinates: 17.060149°N 80.123634°E
- Country: India
- State: Andhra Pradesh

Languages
  - Official: Telugu
- Time zone: UTC+5:30 (IST)
- Postal code: 507169
- Vehicle registration: TS 04
- Website: www.banapuram.com

Banapuram is a small village located 30 km from Khammam district headquarters in Telangana, India. Administratively Khammam is divided into 42 revenue divisions. This village comes in Mudigonda revenue division. Literacy rate is around 60%.
