= Leo Trepp =

German-American rabbi

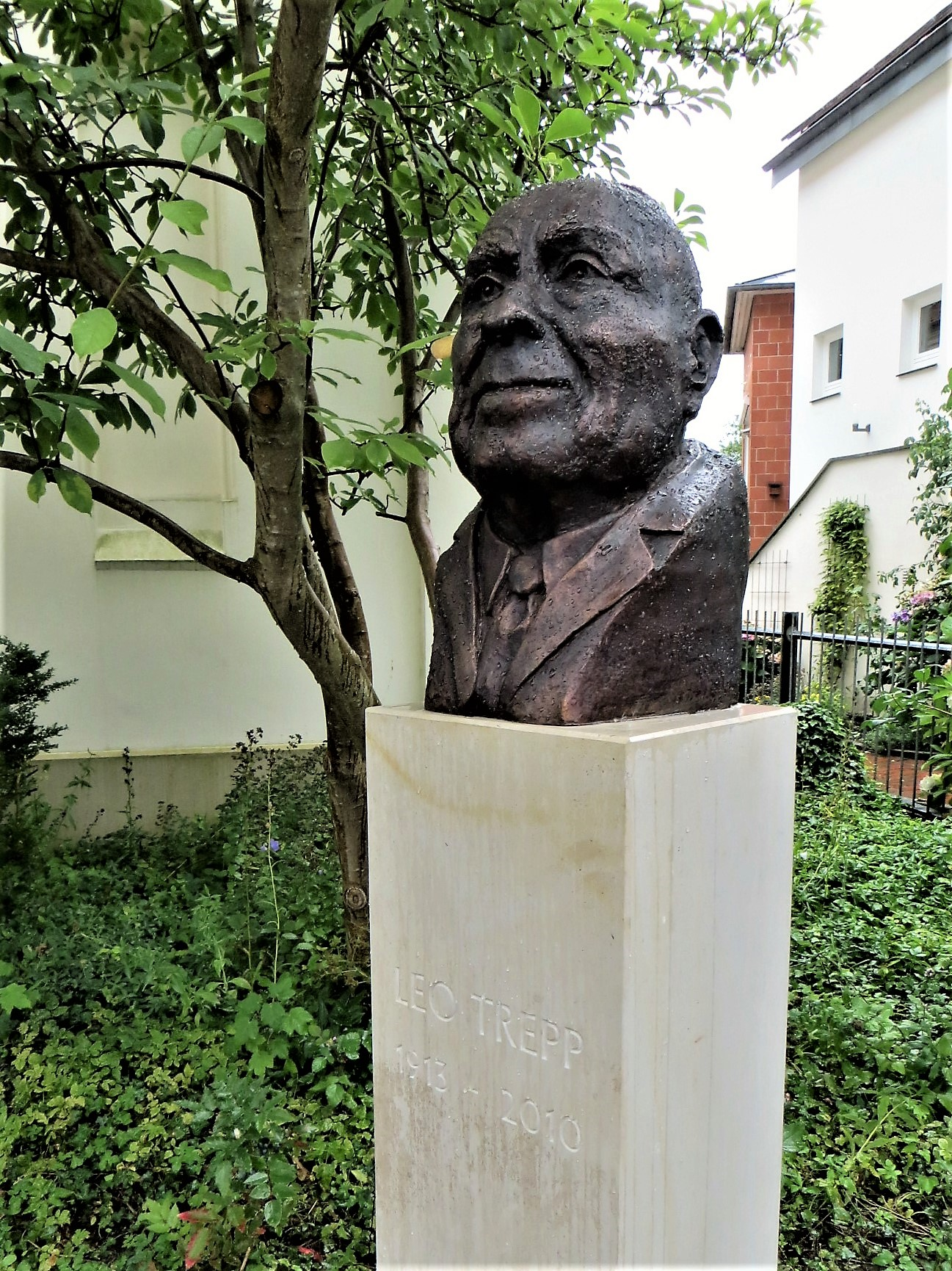
Leo Trepp

Leo Trepp (March 4, 1913 – September 2, 2010) was a German-born American rabbi who was the last surviving rabbi who had led a congregation in Nazi Germany during the early days of The Holocaust.

== Early life and work ==
Trepp was born on March 4, 1913, in Mainz, Germany. He studied philosophy and philology at the University of Frankfurt and the University of Berlin and in 1935 received his doctorate from the University of Würzburg. He was ordained by the Hildesheimer Rabbinical Seminary in 1936. Trepp recalled having conducted his first seder in 1936 in Oldenburg, when he was a newly ordained rabbi in Nazi Germany, leading the 15 synagogues in the district. He saw that he had a dual role in working "to keep the Jewish community from breaking down, while at the same time give many fellow believers the possibility to emigrate". As Jews were forbidden to attend public schools, Trepp asked the local Nazi officials if he could form a school in a synagogue in Oldenburg to educate Jewish children together with Aryan students, and was given approval for his plan, along with funding for school supplies and desks, as well as rent for the space that was being used as a school.

== Imprisonment ==
On Kristallnacht, an anti-Semitic pogrom that took place on the night of November 9, 1938 and resulted in the destruction of hundreds of synagogues and the deaths of 91 Jews, Trepp was arrested and placed in the Sachsenhausen concentration camp, where he was held as one of as many as 30,000 Jews who were arrested and held in prison camps by the Nazis. In the wake of Jews being detained and dying, Trepp saw his role as being part of "a very rewarding rabbinate because the Jews needed me". He recalled the inmates being called out in Sachsenhausen at 4:00 in the morning, seeing the guard towers manned with soldiers holding machine guns and being told "You are the dregs of humanity. I don't see why you should live". He told God that he was prepared to die, but was overcome with the feeling that "God was with me. I know God was there. In the concentration camp with me. And it was the worst place for it. That's why it was the best."

Trepp was released from Sachsenhausen after 18 days of incarceration through the intervention of Joseph Herman Hertz, the Chief Rabbi of the United Kingdom—under the condition that he and his wife had two weeks to leave the country.

He went first to England and then to the United States in 1940. He ultimately moved to Northern California, where he led three congregations, Beth Shalom [Napa, California], including Beth Ami in Santa Rosa, California and Beth El in Berkeley.

== After the war ==
Trepp was a frequent visitor to Mainz, where he was involved in the restoration and revitalization of the Weisenau synagogue. Starting in 1983, Trepp spent 20 years teaching Jewish religion, Jewish mysticism and Talmud to students at the Johannes Gutenberg University of Mainz. He was the author of the books The Complete Book of Jewish Observance, A History of the Jewish Experience and Judaism: Development and Life.

Despite his longstanding efforts at fostering Christian–Jewish reconciliation, Trepp expressed concern that in the hands of nationalists and Islamists that "Anti-Semitism has become acceptable again". Speaking to German youth in 1993, he stated that "You bear no guilt for what your grandparents did. But there is responsibility. Germany must become the leading country in the fight against anti-Semitism."

Trepp was the subject of the 2009 German language documentary film Der Letzte Rabbiner by Christian Walther, which was translated into English and shown as The Last Rabbi. A resident of San Francisco, Rabbi Trepp conducted his 74th, and final, Passover Seder there with his extended family in 2010. Trepp died at age 97 on September 2, 2010, in San Francisco.

After his death, Trepp's wife, Gunda Trepp, compiled his notes and published his autobiography, The Last Rabbi.
