= Durjaya (Andhra chieftain) =

Eponymous Progenitor

Durjaya (Sanskrit for "difficult to conquer" or "invincible") was a legendary chieftain of ancient Andhra. The identity of Durjaya remains unknown. Several ruling dynasties of medieval Andhra and Telangana, such as the Kakatiyas, Velanati Chodas, Malyalas, Viryalas, Haihayas, Konakandravadis, Ivani Kandravadis, Kondapadumatis, Natavadis, Parichchedis, Kotas, and Chagis, claimed descent from him. In the opinion of Bhavaraju Venkata Krishna Rao, he probably flourished in the 3rd century CE.
