= John Gunda =

South African politician

John Gunda is a South African politician. He was a member of the Independent Democrats and later switched to the African National Congress.

== Career ==
John Gunda joined the Independent Democrats (ID) in 2003 and was elected in 2004. He resigned in 2008 then was re-elected in 2009. In 2005, whilst leader of the Northern Cape ID, Gunda was convicted of raping a woman and sentenced to 10 years imprisonment. The following year, he was cleared of all charges. In September 2010 he was named and shamed by ID leader Patricia de Lille as among the worst offenders in the abuse by MPs of parliamentary travel allowances.

On 6 May 2014, the night before the 2014 South African general election, Gunda left the Democratic Alliance (into which the Independent Democrats had merged) and joined the African National Congress (ANC).

== Personal life ==
As of 2006, Gunda was married with three children.
