= Beta II =

Kakatiya ruler from 1076 to 1108

Beta
- Tribhuvana-Malla, Maha-Mandaleshvara, Vikrama-Chakrin,

Kakatiya ruler
- Reign: c. 1076-1108 CE
- Predecessor: Prola I
- Successor: Durga-raja or Prola II
- Dynasty: Kakatiya
- Father: Prola I

Beta II (r. c. 1076-1108 CE) alias Tribhuvana-Malla was a member of the Kakatiya dynasty of southern India. As a Kalyani Chalukya vassal, he obtained control of the Sabbi-1000 province centred around Vemulavada. He commissioned a Shaivite shrine, and also donated land for a Jaina temple.

== Career ==
Beta II was a son of the Kakatiya chief Prola I. His earliest extant inscription is the 1079 CE Anumakonda inscription, which calls him Shriman Vikrama-chakri Shri Beta-mandalikottamah. His overlord, the Kalyani Chalukya king Vikramaditya VI, appears to have conferred the title Vikrama-chakrin upon him. His reign probably started around the time when Vikramaditya VI ascended the throne in 1076 CE. The 1082 CE Banajipet inscription describes him as Maha-mandaleshvara Betarasa ("king Beta"), the lord of Anmakonda-pura (city of Anumakonda). The Kakatiya inscriptions generally refer to him as Tribhuvana-malla; this title probably signifies his submission to Vikramaditya, who held the same title.

Beta appears to have been involved in a dispute with other Chalukya vassals over the control of the historical Sabbi-nadu region centered around Vemulavada. The 1053 CE Sanigaram inscription of Prola I states that the Chalukya king rewarded him with the territory of Sabbi-nadu. The Kakatiya inscriptions found at Sanigaram (including the 1107 CE Sanigaram inscription of Beta II) in this region suggest that the Kakatiyas controlled this region. However, various inscriptions found at Vemulavada, the most important town of Sabbi-nadu, suggest that this region was controlled by other Chalukya governors including Rajaditya (1083 CE), the Chalukya prince Someshvara (1106 CE), and the Paramara prince Jagaddeva (1108 CE). It is possible that the Kakatiyas controlled only a part of Sabbi-nadu, which included Sanigaram but excluded Vemulavada. The Padmakshi Temple inscription suggests that Beta approached the Chalukya king with the help of his minister (dandadhipa) Vaija, and obtained the entire Sabbi-nadu region comprising a thousand villages ("Sabbi-1000").

Beta II's son Durga-raja was actively involved in his father's administration, as suggested by the 1098 CE Kazipet inscription, which records a donation made by a minister of Durga-raja.

The 1120 CE Matedu inscription issued by the Kakatiya vassal Vembola Boddama Mallenayaka of the Pulinda family states that his father Reva collected tributes on behalf of Beta II and suppressed revolts.

The last inscription from Beta's reign is the 1107 CE Sanigaram inscription, which suggests that his reign ended around 1108 CE. He was succeeded by his sons, first Durga-raja and then Prola II.

== Cultural activities ==
The 1082 CE Banajipet inscription states that Beta II gifted land and a house site to a Jaina temple established by Medarasa, another vassal of the Chalukya king Vikramaditya alias Tribhuvana-malla. Medarasa came from the Ugravadiya family of Vengomtakula, and like Beta, bore the title Maha-mandaleshvara.

The 1098 CE Kazipet inscription records the construction of locality called Shiva-pura in Anumakonda, and of a shrine called Beteshvara ("Lord of Beta") named after Beta. It appears that Beta commissioned the village and the temple, and his son Durga-raja granted Shiva-pura to the Shaivite ascetic Rameshvara Pandita on 24 November 1090, on the occasion of a solar eclipse. Rameshvara belonged to the Kalamukha sect, and was the acharya of Mallikarjuna-Shila matha of Shriparvata. Another part of the Kazipet inscription states that a minister of Durga-raja established a Kirti-stambha in 1098 CE.

== Inscriptions ==
Following inscriptions from Beta II's reign have been discovered.

- 1079 CE Anumakonda inscription
- 1082 CE Banajipet inscription
- 1098 CE Kazipet dargah inscription, issued by his son Durga-raja
- 1107 CE Sanigaram inscription
