= Gunda Trepp =

German author and journalist

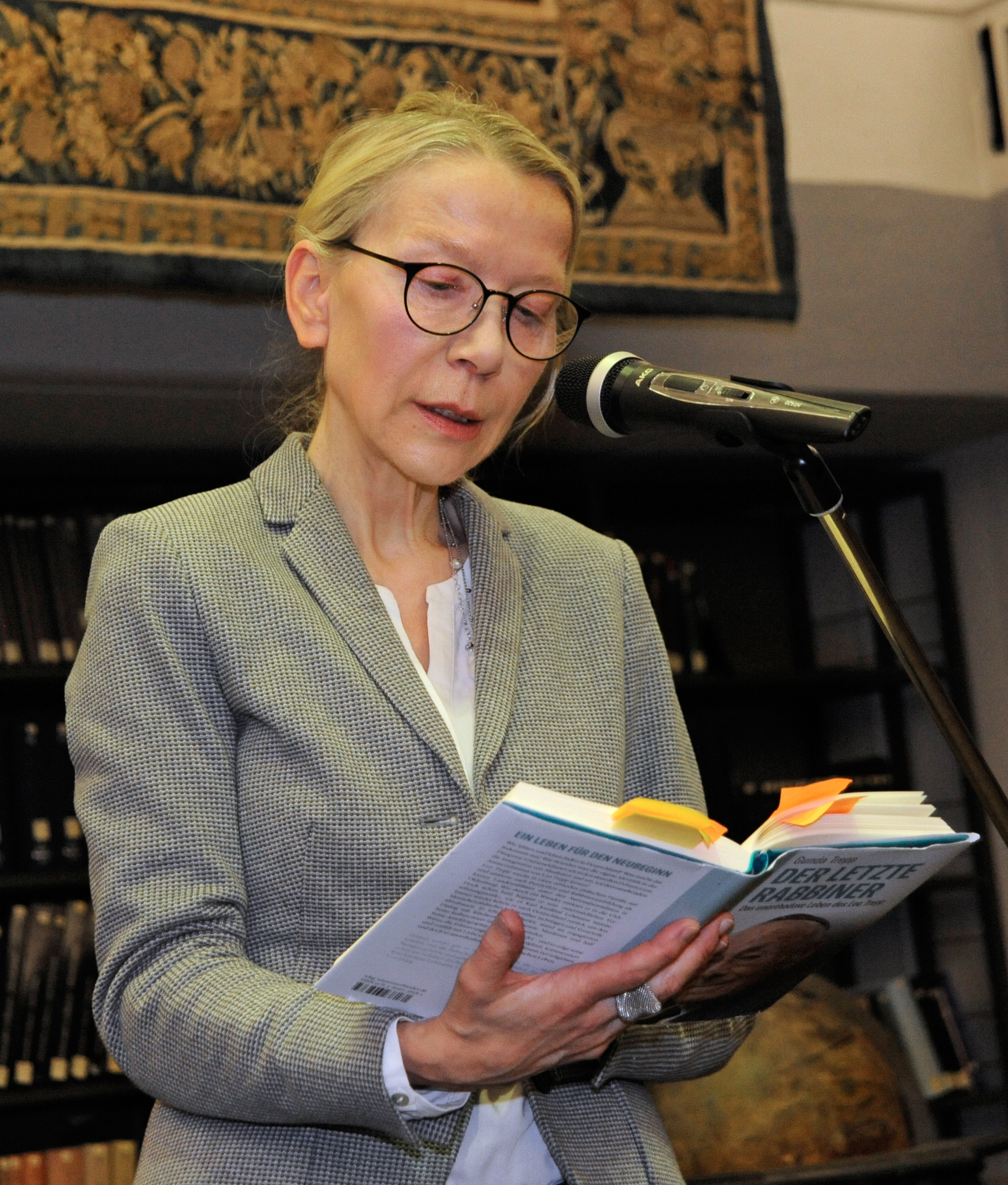
Gunda Trepp at a reading of The Last Rabbi in October 2018

Gunda Trepp (born 30 December 1958) is a German author and journalist.

== Biography ==
Trepp was born in Oldenburg, Germany. From 1982 to 1987, she studied law at the Free University of Berlin. She subsequently attended the Henri-Nannen-School of Journalism. After embarking on her professional career as a lawyer and law lecturer, she began working as a freelance journalist for various media such as Der Spiegel, Frankfurter Allgemeine Zeitung, and the NDR. Trepp was business editor at the Berliner Zeitung until 2004. In 2000, she started a relationship with the religious philosopher and rabbi Leo Trepp and converted to Judaism in 2001.

== Works ==
Together with Leo Trepp, she wrote the book "Dein Gott ist mein Gott". Wege zum Judentum und zur jüdischen Gemeinschaft (Your God is my God. Journey to Judaism and the Jewish community), published in 2005. In 2007, Trepp's book So viele Tage ohne dich (So many days without you) was published by Verlag Herder. Three years after Leo Trepp's death, Gunda Trepp published texts written from 1943 to 2010 on Lebendiges Judentum (Vibrant Judaism). Her most recent publication is Der letzte Rabbiner. Das unorthodoxe Leben des Leo Trepp (The Last Rabbi. The unorthodox life of Leo Trepp) (2018). According to Simon Berninger (Frankfurter Rundschau newspaper), the biography is "the key to understanding this very unusual rabbi". In Jüdische Rundschau, Nikoline Hansen writes that the book is "not only a gripping read but also manages to bring back to life the voice of Leo Trepp" In an interview with Christiane Florin (Deutschlandfunk radio), Gunda Trepp says that only through knowledge and education can non-Jewish Germans help fight antisemitism. They particularly should know more "about how Jewish people live today, about Jewish ethics and how the State of Israel was created". In 2022, german publisher wbg published her latest book "Gebrauchsanweisung gegen Antisemitismus", dealing with the problem of antisemitism and how to efficiently fight it. The same year, Trepp wrote a new foreword and edited "Die Juden" by her late husband, Rabbi Leo Trepp, which was re-issued by Hentrich&Hentrich in the fall of 2022.

== List of works ==
- „Vor der Pause habe ich richtig Angst". Gewalt und Mobbing unter Jugendlichen. Was man dagegen tun kann, Frankfurt am Main: Campus Verlag, 1998.
- „Dein Gott ist mein Gott“. Wege zum Judentum und zur jüdischen Gemeinschaft, together with Leo Trepp, Stuttgart: Kohlhammer Verlag, 2005.
- So viele Tage ohne dich. Dein Tod, meine Trauer, mein Leben, Freiburg: Herder Verlag, 2007.
- Lebendiges Judentum. Texte aus den Jahren 1943 bis 2010, written by Leo Trepp, redacted by Gunda Trepp, Stuttgart: Kohlhammer Verlag, 2013.
- Der letzte Rabbiner: Das unorthodoxe Leben des Leo Trepp, WBG Theiss, Darmstadt 2018.
- Gebrauchsanweisung gegen Antisemitismus, wbg Paperback, Darmstadt 2022.
