= Mudigonda =

- town
- Location in Telangana, India Mudigonda (India)
- Coordinates: 17.1833°N 80.0916°E
- Country: India
- State: Telangana
- District: Khammam
- Elevation: 130 m (430 ft)

Languages
  - Official: Telugu
- Time zone: UTC+5:30 (IST)
- PIN: 507158
- Telephone code: 08742
- Vehicle registration: TS
- Lok Sabha constituency: Khammam
- Vidhan Sabha constituency: Madhira
- Website: telangana.gov.in

Mudigonda is a town and revenue-divisional headquarters located 14 km from Khammam, the headquarters of the Khammam District of Telangana, India.

== Introduction ==
Mudigonda is one of the mandal headquarters in Khammam district. It is located along the Khammam-Kodad main road. Mudigonda mandal is surrounded by lot of villages, of which Vallabhi and Bhanapuram are the biggest. The main occupation of the people is agriculture. It is also featured with a rural police station, since it is a politically sensitive mandal. There are huge granite deposits and number of granite mills. Tourist spots at Mudigonda include the Sri Chennakesava and Sri Lakshmi Narasimha Swami temples, Sri Lakshmi Narasimha Swamy Gattu, and the Sri Veera Brahmendhra Swami temples. It was once the capital city of Mudigonda Chalukyas.

== Villages ==
The villages in Mudigonda mandal includes: Ammapeta, Banapuram, Chirumarri, Gandhasiri, Gokinepalli, Kamalapuram, Kattakoor, New Lakshmipuram, Madhapuram, Mallannapalem, Mallaram, Medepalli, Mudigonda, Mutharam, Pammi, Pandregupalli, Pedamandava, Suvarnapuram, Vallabhi, Vallapuram, Vanam Vari Krishnapuram, Venkatapuram and Yadavalli

== Police firing ==
The communist parties' agitation seeking land for the landless poor in Telangana took a violent turn on 28 July 2007 as at least eight agitators were killed in the police firing on the protestors here in Mudigonda town.

The policemen, most of them in plainclothes as they generally do in naxalite-prone areas, opened fire on the agitators when the protests turned violent and the vehicle of a senior police officer was attacked. The driver of a truck, which was stopped by the protestors, was also among the dead.

Telugu TV channels aired pictures of policemen firing several rounds from automatic weapons on the protestors. Most of the victims were inadvertently shot above the legs due to the tense situation under which the out-numbered security personnel were operating.

The police firing evoked sharp reaction from all opposition parties. The main opposition party in Andhra Pradesh (present day Telangana State), the Telugu Desam Party (TDP), which had backed the day long shutdown, termed the police firing as barbaric and inhuman.

Eight persons, including a woman, were killed and eight others injured, three of them critically, when police fired to quell a stone-pelting mob at Mudigonda village in Khammam district as the bandh turned violent.
