= Bayyaram =

- Mandal
- Location in Telangana, India Bayyaram (India)
- Country: India
- State: Telangana
- District: Mahabubabad district

Languages
  - Official: Telugu
- Time zone: UTC+5:30 (IST)
- PIN: 507211
- Telephone code: 08745
- Vehicle registration: TS-26
- Nearest city: Warangal
- Lok Sabha constituency: Mahabubabad
- Vidhan Sabha constituency: Yellandu
- Climate: hot (Köppen)
- Website: www.bayyaram.com

Bayyaram is a mandal in Mahabubabad district of Telangana.

== Bayyaram Mines ==
In 2010, there was a controversy regarding lease of 56,690 hectares of land in Bayyaram, Garla and Nelakondapally mandals. This has finally resulted in cancellation of the lease by Ministry of Mines.

== Villages ==
The villages in Bayyaram mandal include:

- Balajipeta
- Bayyaram
- Gowraram
- Irsulapuram
- Kambalapalli
- Kothapeta
- Kotagadda
- Ramachandrapuram
- Rangapuram
- Satyanarayanapuram
- Uppalapadu
- Venkatapuram
- Venkatrampuram
- Yellandu
- Jagatharaopeta
