= Kuravi =

- Village
- Location in Telangana, India
- Coordinates: 17°31′30″N 80°00′05″E
- Country: India
- State: Telangana
- District: Mahabubabad district
- Talukas: Kuravi

Languages
  - Official: Telugu
- Time zone: UTC+5:30 (IST)
- PIN: 506105
- Telephone code: 08719
- Vehicle registration: TS 03

Kuravi is a village in Mahabubabad district of the Indian state of Telangana. It is located in Kuravi mandal.

== Geography ==
Kuravi/Korvi is around 70 km away from Warangal by train and is around 11 km away from the Mahabubabad town.
