= Chhajja =

Type of eave in Indian architecture

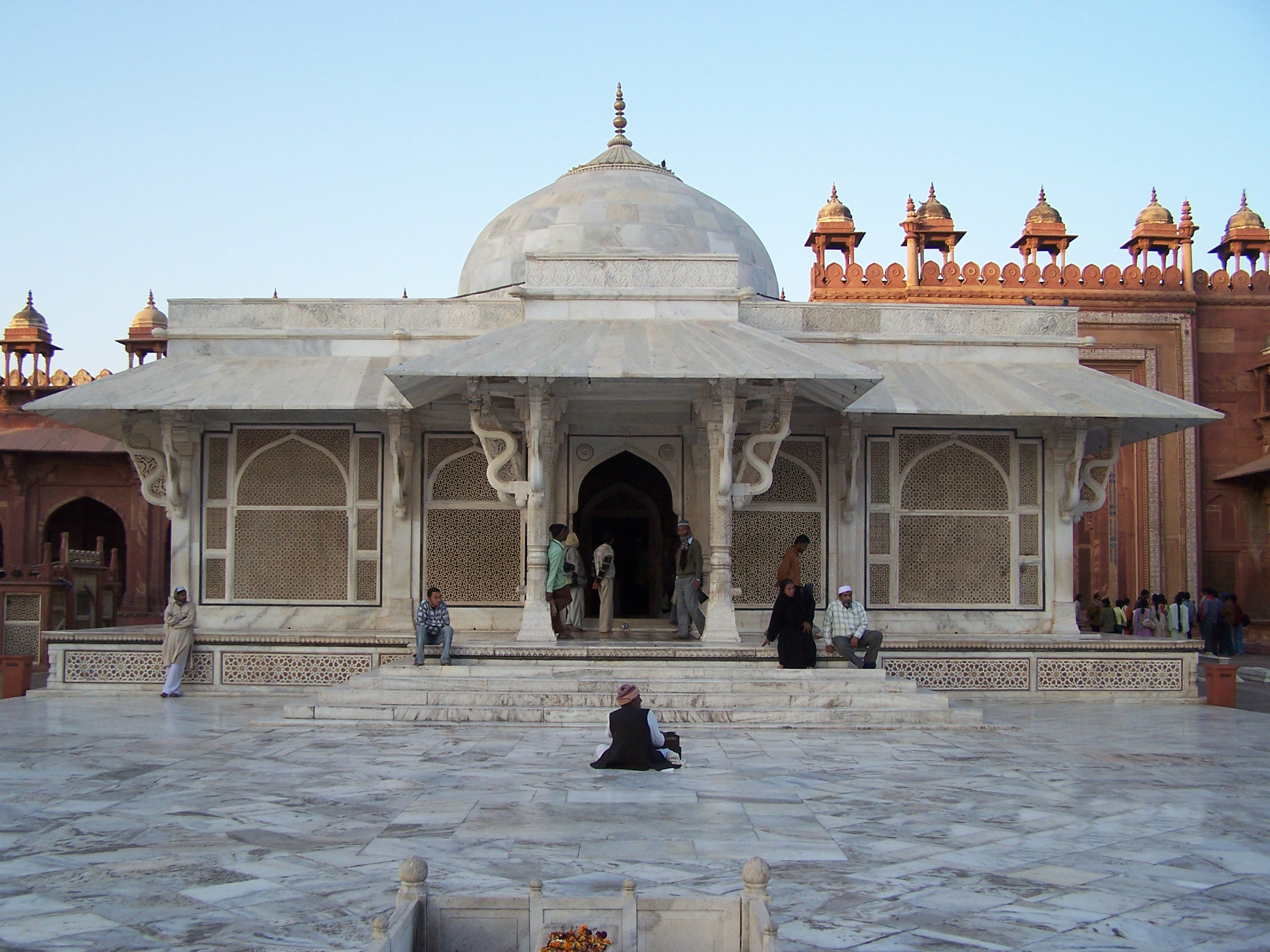
The tomb of Salim Chishti in Fatehpur Sikri (India) exhibiting a deep chhajja following the perimeter of the building supported with elaborate brackets

A chhajja is an overhanging eave or roof covering found in Indian architecture. It is characterised with large support brackets with different artistic designs. Variation is also seen in its size depending on the importance of the building on which it features or the choice of the designer.

Its function is similar to that of overhangs or eaves; it adorns and protects entrances, arches, and windows from the outside elements, and provides shade from radiation. Chhajjas also aid in the facade-making in Rajasthani architecture. Some styles of roof can be considered large chhajja as well.

== History ==
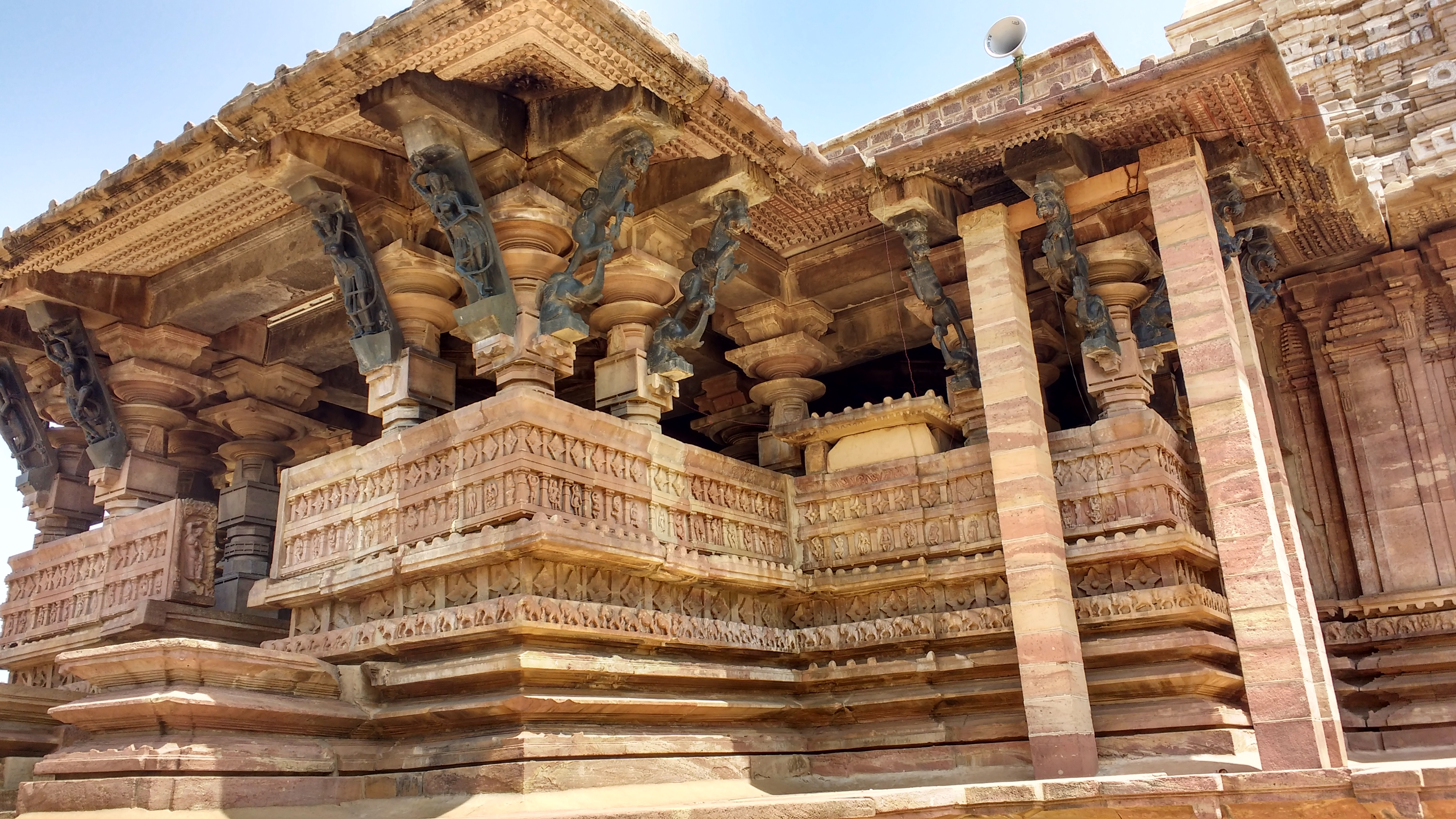
The Ramappa Temple in Warangal features a pink sandstone chhajja supported by brackets carved from dark basalt.

Although there is no conclusive agreement on when the chhajja emerged as an architectural element, its origins in Indian architecture predate the rise of the Mughal Empire. British indologist John Burton-Page noted the growing use of chhajjas in palaces and mosques constructed in Delhi during the reign of Firuz Shah Tughlaq in the 14th century, describing them as "aspects of the Hindu tradition." Earlier examples of chajjas are seen in multiple Hindu temples constructed during and prior to the 13th century, including the Ramappa Temple in Warangal, the Konark Sun Temple, the Kandariya Mahadeva Temple in Khajuraho, and the Modhera Sun Temple.

The original inspiration of the chhajja and much of the other Indian architectural elements with which it is commonly not seen can be traced back to building design from older periods, such as that of bamboo and thatch village huts that can still be found today. The material used to create these buildings may have been built in stone and can be similar to more modern buildings. This works especially well to counteract the specific climate of the region, as many older architectural designs have been improved to deal with these problems.

Much of the popular use of chajjas was during the time of the Mughals. Curved chhajja became popular in Mughal architecture particularly during and after the reign of Shah Jahan. By the time that buildings like the Jahangiri Mahal at Agra and the palace complex at Fathpur Sikri were built, it had emerged as a popular and important architectural element of Mughal architecture. Later in the Mughal rule, buildings like the Zafar Mahal also illustrated a use for the chhajja for both practical and ornamental means.

== Usage ==
Although chhajja are generally constructed in a manner which can be seen as aesthetically artistic, they have many usage cases in many different types of buildings.

=== Usage in Mughal Architecture ===
Despite initial Mughal built mosques not featuring chhajja, the Baburi (Babur style) mosque built in Ayodhya features eaves in the form of chhajja. After this, chhajja were not a rare sight in mosque architecture within the Indian subcontinent, such as those within the mosques of Sirhind, where many of the arches are adorned with chhajja.

Although Mughal architecture is the dominant user of chhajja, lesser known constructions undertaken by the Maratha Empire in occupied territory also features this, such as in the architectural remains in Bahadurgarh, formerly known as Saydabad. Despite the usual aesthetically eloquent chhajja constructions seen in Indian architecture, a more practical utilitarian version is used in forts as found in the remains at Bahadurgarh.

What appears to be chhajja also appears on fortifications in Mughal Sarai such as the one found at Doraha for both a practical and decorative purpose. Here, chhajja are seen in an elegant semi-hexagonal configuration. There is speculation that here there were more chhajja that have since crumbled.

Mahals and palaces were frequently built with extravagant artistic chhajja. This is seen in buildings such as the Zafar Mahal constructed during the late Mughal rule. This features a chhajja formed with multi-foliated arches resting on four baluster columns, creating an extravagant appearance.

Chhajja and other architectural elements that supplement it appear mostly in buildings such as residential, administrative and formal buildings and pavilions. Much like on other ways of life, imperial builders possibly wished to represent a sincere desire to find emotional rapport with the local people through identifying with local architectural elements. This suggests chhajja have been used for longer than current standing structures would represent.

=== Modern Usage ===
Chhajja are seen in contemporary architecture where there have been attempts to replicate a traditional middle eastern or Indian subcontinent architectural style.

The common usage of chhajja is portrayed in the first two stanzas of Ashwini Magotra's 2004 poem "Lohri":

Here comes Lohri, festival of youngsters
moving with arms around each other
dancing Bhangra, going around asking Lohri-gifts
Oh, here's a group dressed as Haran
There's another, with decorated Chhajja
cavorting to steps of Dandaras

== Bibliography ==
- Burton-Page, John (2008). Indian Islamic Architecture. Boston: Brill Publishers. ISBN 9789004163393.
- Yazdani, Ghulam (1952). History of the Deccan: Volume 1 (PDF). London: Oxford University Press.
- Yazdani, Ghulam (1922). The Temples at Palampet (1st ed.). New Delhi: Indological Book Corporation.
- Mitra, Debala (1976). Konarak. New Delhi: Archaeological Survey of India.
- Brown, Percy (1959). Indian Architecture (Buddhist and Hindu) (4th ed.). Bombay: D.B. Taraporevala Sons & Co.
- Nath, Ram (1972). The Immortal Taj Mahal. Bombay: D.B. Taraporevala Sons & Co.
