= Ramappa Temple =

13th century Kakatiya Hindu temple in Telangana

- Rudreshwara Temple
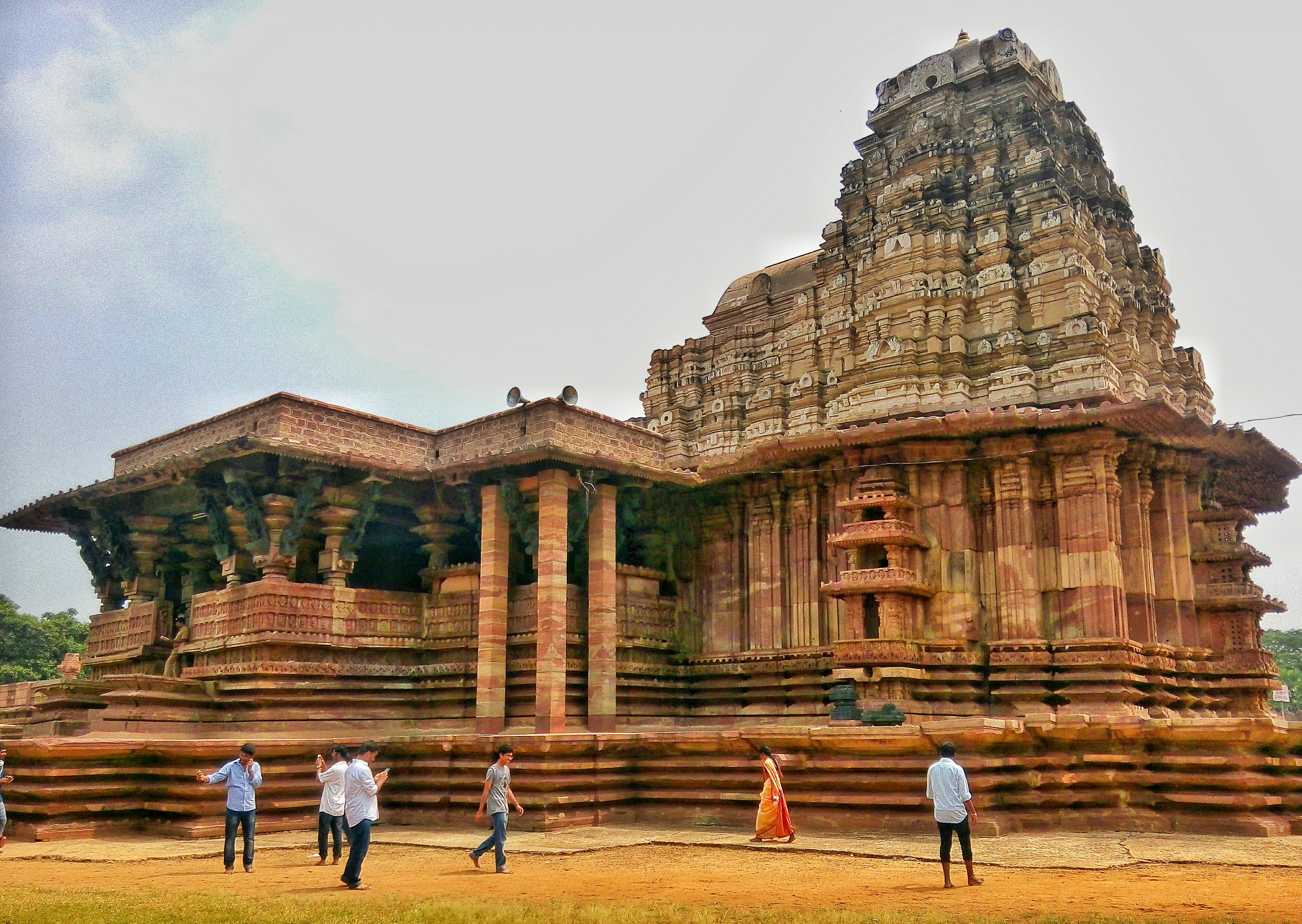

- Location in Telangana

Religion
- Affiliation: Hinduism
- District: Mulugu
- Deity: Shiva

Location
- Location: Palampet
- State: Telangana
- Country: India
- Coordinates: 18°15′33″N 79°56′36″E

Architecture
- Architect: Ramappa
- Type: Kakatiya architecture
- Creator: Recherla Rudra
- Established: 1213
- Completed: 13th century
- Direction of façade: East-facing
- UNESCO World Heritage Site
- Official name: Kakatiya Rudreshwara (Ramappa) Temple, Telangana
- Criteria: Cultural: (i)(iii)
- Designated: 2021 (44th session)
- Reference no.: 1570
- Monument of National Importance
- Official name: Ramappa Temple
- Reference no.: N-TG-5

The Rudreshwara Temple, more commonly known as the Ramappa Temple, is a Hindu temple located in the village of Palampet in eastern Telangana, India. An inscription on a basalt pillar found within a nearby courtyard records that the temple was commissioned in 1213 by Recherla Rudra, a military general of the Kakatiya dynasty, and constructed over a period of 40 years during the reign of Ganapati, the third sovereign of the dynasty. Dedicated to the Hindu deity Shiva, it is a prominent example of Kakatiya architecture, and combines elements of Dravidian and Chalukyan architectural styles.

The temple is primarily constructed of red sandstone, with intricately carved pillars and brackets of granite and dolerite. It exhibits several unique architectural features, including a vimana built with lightweight, buoyant clay bricks and a "sandbox"-style foundation designed to absorb the seismic loads generated by earthquakes. The temple suffered minor damage during Malik Kafur's invasion of Warangal in 1310, and its condition significantly deteriorated after the subsequent decline and fall of the Kakatiya dynasty. In 1916, the temple was surveyed and renovated by Ghulam Yazdani, the director of the Archaeological Department of Hyderabad. Following Indian independence, the management and maintenance of the temple was handed over to the Archaeological Survey of India in 1948.

In addition to the main temple, the overall complex encompasses multiple partially ruined structures, including two smaller stone temples, a pakashala (kitchen), and a closed mandapa containing a monolithic sculpture of the guardian deity Nandi. The temple is located near Ramappa Lake, an artificial reservoir constructed by the Kakatiyas in the 13th century to store rainwater; according to local legend, both structures are named after the chief architect of the temple. On July 25, 2021, the Ramappa Temple was declared a World Heritage Site by UNESCO for being "an outstanding marvel of the Kakatiyan culture." The temple was recommended for recognition as a Monument of National Importance on February 18, 2026 by the Archaeological Survey of India.

== Etymology ==
The name Rudreshwara, a portmanteau of Rudra and Ishvara, is of Sanskrit origin. Rudra (lit. "howler"), originally a Rigvedic deity, is an epithet of the Hindu god Shiva, the chief deity of the Ramappa Temple. Ishvara (lit. "lord", "master") refers to multiple aspects of the Supreme Being in different Hindu traditions, and is also a common epithet for Shiva. It is thought that the name of the temple represents a play on words, as it is also named after Recherla Rudra, the general who commissioned the temple's construction.

== Background ==
In 1199, the Kakatiya ruler Mahadeva was killed in battle during a protracted conflict with Jaitugi of the Seuna dynasty, who subsequently captured and imprisoned Mahadeva's nephew Ganapati. In the following months, Mahadeva's commander-in-chief Recherla Rudra took over the administration of the kingdom and quelled an attempted rebellion by a chieftain of unknown origin named Nagati. Following entreaties by Rudra and other Kakatiya ministers, Ganapati was released by Jaitugi and installed as the ruler of the Kakatiyas after pledging to serve as his vassal. Under the rule of Ganapati, the Kakatiya dynasty reached its greatest territorial extent. Rudra served as the commander-in-chief of Ganapati's forces, and played a significant role in consolidating Ganapati's position and expanding the kingdom's dominions. As a mark of gratitude, Ganapati granted Rudra the town of Palampet, where he excavated an artificial reservoir known as Ramappa Lake and began construction of a large temple complex dedicated to Shiva in year 1135 of the Shaka era (1213 AD).

The Ramappa Temple was constructed over a period of 40 years. The relatively remote location of the temple complex, which is situated within the foothills of a forested area close to Ramappa Lake, was chosen as a means of integrating the temple into a natural setting. Its design and construction were influenced by earlier examples of Kakatiya temples, including the Thousand Pillar Temple at Hanamakonda and the Swayambhu Temple in Warangal Fort, and coincided with a larger wave of Shaivite temple-building in the Indian subcontinent during the 12th and 13th centuries. The chief architect of the temple is not known from any contemporary inscriptions; a local oral tradition credits the monument's design to a Kannadiga architect named Ramappa, after whom the temple and the nearby Ramappa Lake were later named.

=== Later years ===
In 1310, Delhi Sultanate general Malik Kafur laid siege to the Kakatiya capital of Warangal. Some of the idols and iconography of the temple suffered minor damage as a result of the conflict. Following the decline and fall of the Kakatiya dynasty in the 14th century, the temple complex ceased to be maintained and was largely abandoned. During the subsequent period of neglect, the temples were overgrown by trees and vegetation, which caused damage to the walls and other structural elements of the complex. The temple also survived an earthquake of significant magnitude in the 17th century.

Shortly after the turn of the 20th century, the Ramappa Temple and its surrounding environs were incorporated into Hyderabad State, and fell under the aegis of the newly formed Archaeological Department of Hyderabad. On December 13, 1916, Indian archaeologist Ghulam Yazdani, the department's inaugural director, traveled to Palampet and described the temples in the village as "perhaps the brightest stars in the galaxy of medieval Deccan temples". He began conservation efforts at the site, including the erection of columns to support a collapsing section of the Ramappa temple's roof and the restoration of two sculpted basalt figurines to the eastern entrance of the temple. Yazdani wrote that the figurines had been stolen from the temple by a local district officer, who "wished to carry them home to decorate his house." Following Indian independence, the management and maintenance of the Ramappa Temple was handed over to the Archaeological Survey of India in 1948.

== Architecture ==
Western entrance to the complex

Monolithic sculpture of Nandi

Carved granite pillar

Exterior view of the vimana

Decorative carvings

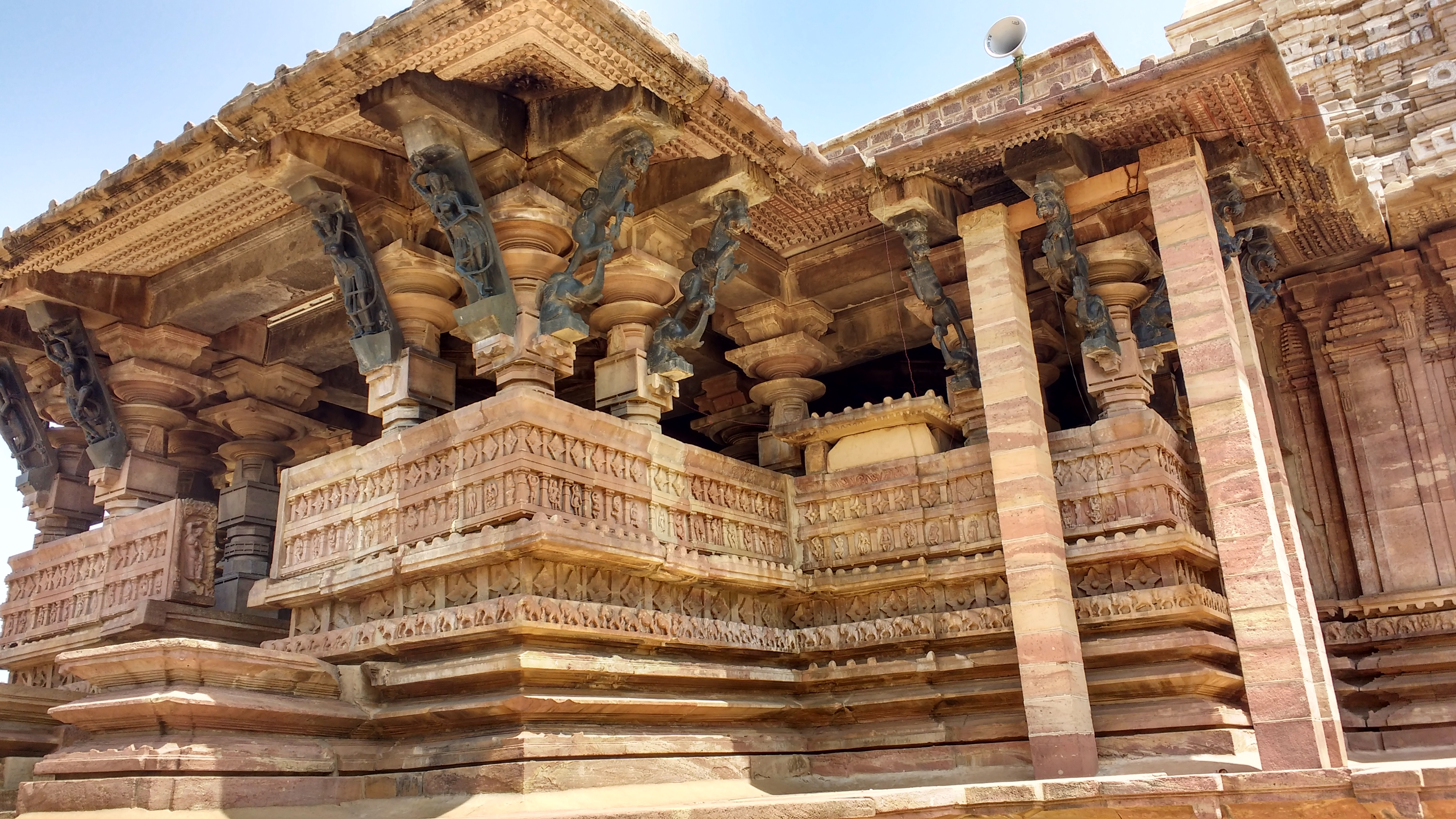
Chhajja supported by brackets

Bracket carving of dancer

“To describe the temple of Ramappa is to demonstrate the inadequacy of the written word. Historians and pundits of architecture have attempted what may be termed a technical exposition of this remarkable structure. But they have failed to conjure up even a faint picture of the temple and its wealth of artistry and breathtaking beauty.”

— P. V. Narasimha Rao, Ramappa: A Symphony in Stone (1966)

The Ramappa Temple has been described as a "masterpiece" of Kakatiya architecture in the Deccan due to its engineering and sculptural innovations. The superstructure of the temple is primarily composed of pink, medium-grained sandstone, with granite used in the construction of the ceiling slabs, columns and beams. Many of the sculptures, motifs and bracket figures in the temple were chiseled out of dolerite, a black microcrystalline igneous rock, and subsequently polished to a mirror finish. Sand was used as a filler material within the temple's foundations, and to prepare the lime mortar used in the temple's brick masonry.

The architectural style of the Ramappa Temple is characterized by multiple design features influenced by earlier Chalukyan styles of architecture, including the stellate ground plan, the design of the vimana, and the inclusion of bracket sculptures. Art historian Madhusudan Dhaky classifies the temple as an example of Vesara architecture, with elements derived from indigenous Southern Indian temple styles. The temple's shikhara has been described by Scottish historian James Fergusson as "a compromise between the styles of North and South India", comprising characteristics of Indo-Aryan and Dravidian architecture.

=== Plan and exterior ===
Computer-generated model of the temple's exterior

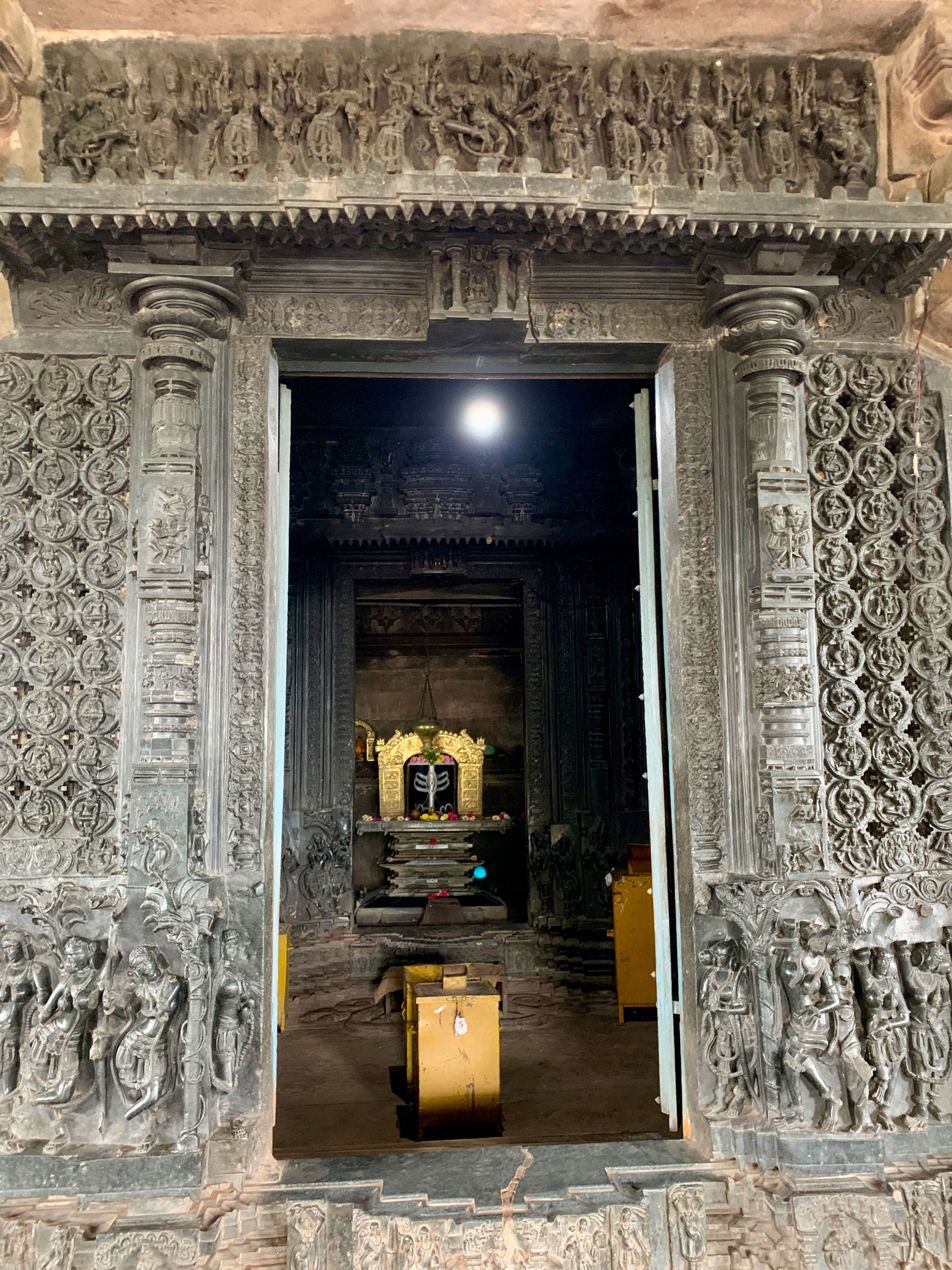
Entrance to the temple antechamber

The Ramappa Temple is located at the center of a large rectangular compound, 272 ft (83 m) in width and 259 ft (79 m) in length. The perimeter of the complex is surrounded by a partially-ruined stone wall or prakaram approximately 9 ft (2.7 m) in height, with two small entrances at the eastern and western ends of the compound. The main temple faces east, in accordance with the principles of vastu shastra, and is situated on a raised star-shaped platform of sandstone roughly 6.5 ft (2.0 m) in height, 139 ft (42 m) long and 125 ft (38 m) wide. Atop the platform is a 10 ft (3.0 m) wide circumambulatory path encircling the temple hall and vimana. A large overhanging cornice projects outwards from the roof of the temple, and is supported by brackets carved from dark basalt.

Decorated porticos flanked by sculptures are located at the northern, eastern, and southern entrances of the main temple. The western side of the monument encloses the inner sanctum or garbhagriha, and is dominated by a five-storied pyramidal vimana crowned by a golden shikhara. A partially collapsed pavilion, known as the Nandi mandapa, is located on a large platform directly in front of the eastern entrance. At the center of the pavilion is a large monolithic sculpture of Nandi carved from dolerite, facing towards the sanctum of the temple.

=== Interior ===
Illustration of carvings at the base of the temple vimana.

The Ramappa Temple has an open floor plan; while the inner shrine is enclosed by walls, the main hall is surrounded by a low parapet and pillars, and is otherwise open to the outside environment. The eastern entrance of the temple leads into a sabhamandapa, a large covered assembly hall 41 ft (12 m) in length surrounded by seating space for devotees. Raised platforms on either side of the sabhamandapa support eight small sandstone alcoves containing ancillary deities. Directly in front of the assembly hall is the rangabhumika, a large circular platform 18 ft (5.5 m) in diameter used to conduct ritualistic music and dance performances. It is surrounded by four intricately carved dolerite pillars, each 15 ft (4.6 m) in height. The walls, ceiling and beams of the temple hall are decorated with sculptures featuring stories and scenes from Hindu mythology, including the Ramayana, the Mahabharata and the Puranas.

Towards the western end of the temple hall is a doorway framed by an architrave depicting Nataraja, a form of the deity Shiva, and two decoratively carved jambs flanked by figures of the river goddesses Ganga and Yamuna. It leads to an enclosed vestibule or antarala, roughly 16 ft (4.9 m) wide and 15 ft (4.6 m) deep. The chamber leads directly to the inner sanctum of the temple through another doorway, topped by a lintel depicting Gajalakshmi, an aspect of the goddess Lakshmi. The garbhagriha is 15 feet 8 inches (4.78 m) square, and contains a lingam resting atop a black basalt plinth.

=== Other monuments ===
The temple complex includes several subsidiary shrines and associated structures.

- Nandi Mandapa: It is located at the entrance of the temple, and houses a statue of Nandi facing the main shrine of Shiva. The structure is noted for its carvings, including the ornamentation of Nandi and decorative panels on the vedibandha (molded base of the temple wall) depicting floral motifs, elephants, musicians, etc.
- Kateswara Temple: This subsidiary shrine dedicated to Kateswara is situated to the north of the main temple. It is built on a raised upapitha and is approached by a flight of steps flanked by carved stone elephant monoliths.
- Kameshwara Temple: The shrine is located to the south of the main temple. Although it is now known as the Kalyana Mandapa because it lacks a garbhgriha and has symmetrical entrances, an inscription of Recharla Rudra identifies the structure as the Kameshwara Temple.
- Ancillary Structures: To the south-west of the main temple is a small room, now known as the Pakashala, which is believed to have served as the kitchen where food was served to the devotees. A mandapa to the north-east of the main temple includes a dolerite pillar bearing a 201-line inscription that records the works of Recharla Rudra, the general who built the Ramappa temple.

Sand was used in the temple's "sandbox" foundation system, where it acted as a cushion to improve earthquake resistance and promote the uniform distribution of structural loads.

The principal manufactured material used in the construction were lightweight porous bricks and iron dowels. The bricks were made from kaolinitic clay mixed with resinous gum from the karea trees, jute fiber and rice husks. When the bricks were treated with fire, the gum burned away leaving air pockets that reduced the density of the bricks to below that of water. These lightweight bricks were used in the construction of vimana to reduce the load on the stone roof. Iron dowels were employed to secure stone blocks and improve the structural stability of the temple.

Some bricks of the Ramappa temple and Humayun's tomb were sent for examination to Dr. Habib Haman, Chief Chemist of Government Industrial Laboratory, Hyderabad, Dn. He has kindly reported as follows: 'The samples of floating bricks from Bidar are similar to those from Warangal as far as the method of manufacture is concerned. The material used to make the brick spongy was apparently saw-dust. The weight of the specimens is 1/3 to 1/4 of the ordinary bricks of the same size. The Bidar specimens show better quality as regards homogeneous mixing and uniform burning than their proto-types from Ramappa, as a result of which the porosity is well-maintained in the body of bricks from Bidar and they float well in water.

== Sculptures ==
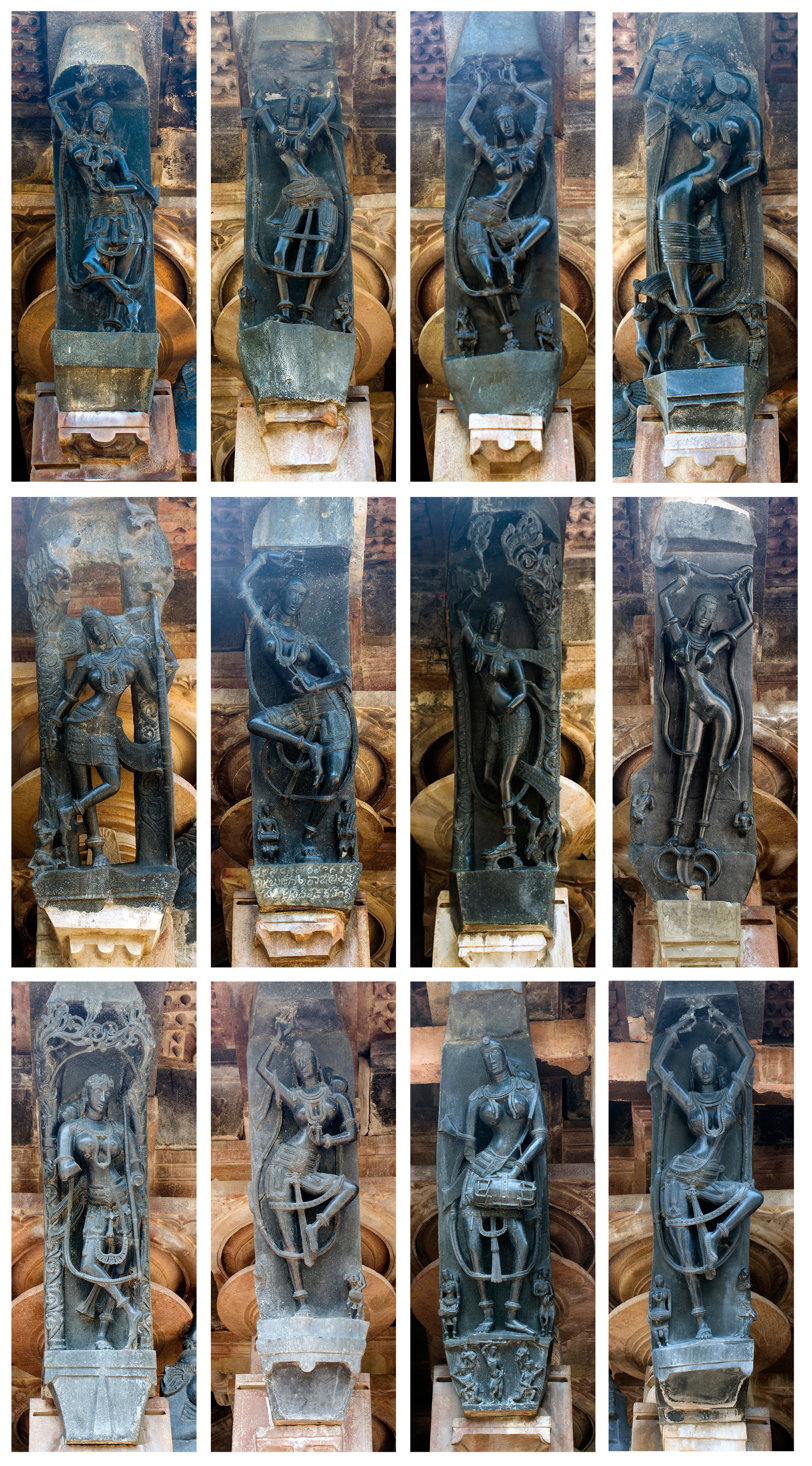
A series of twelve support brackets carved into dancing figures in various poses

The intricate sculptures of the temple were chiseled from dolerite, a hard fine-grained black basalt. These carvings have retained mirror-like polish for more than 800 years. The sculptures are carved as mythical animals or female dancers or musicians, and are "the masterpieces of Kakatiya art, notable for their delicate carving, sensuous postures, and elongated bodies and heads".

The temple is known for its bracket figures of Gaja-Vyala, a mythical creature, and female figures called Madanikas. These bracket figures support the kapota, overhanging eaves. The Madanikas are shown in various roles and dance poses, including a snake-bearing yogini called Nagini, a drummer known as Mardala, a huntress holding a bow and arrow, Rati and a singer standing in tribhanga pose known as Gayani. The Gaja-Vyalas are depicted standing atop the heads of elephants with fierce expressions.

The four central dolerite pillars of the Natya Mandapa, or dance hall, display filigree-like relief work alongside minute depictions of Puranic narratives, chains, and floral motifs. The ceiling depicts episodes from the Ramayana, the Mahabharata, and the Bhagavata Purana, including Samudra Manthana, the destruction of Tripurasura, and the marriage of Shiva and Parvati.

Near the antarala, a hollow-carved stone branch held by a figure known as the Dalamalika produces the seven notes of the musical scale when struck at specific pointes. The door frames of the gharbhgriha and antarala are carved with latticework and scrollwork containing dozens of miniature dancing and drumming figures, while the inlets depict Shiva in multiple forms, including Shivantandava, accompanied by the Saptamatrikas and Ganesha.

In total, the temple contains approximately 600 dance related sculptures ranging from six inches to six feet in height, forming a visual record of dance traditions, including perini, rakasa, prekhana, gavundali, and dandarasaka ghatisisri. Nataraja Ramakrishna revived Perini Shivatandavam (Perini Dance), by seeing the sculptures in this temple. The dance poses, written in Nrtta Ratnavali by Jayapa Senani, also appear in these sculptures.

The temple is named after the sculptor Ramappa, who built it, making it the only temple in India to be named after its craftsman.

== Conservation ==
Formal conservation of the Rudreswara Temple began in 1914 under the Archeological Department of the 7th Nizam of Hyderabad, directed by Professor Ghulam Yazdani. In 1931, Dr. Ghulam Yazdani traced the missing decorations and ornaments of the temple and restored them in its original positions.

Following the 1948 integration of Hyderabad into the Indian Union, custodianship and maintenance were transferred to the Archeological Survey of India (ASI). In 1991, the National Institute of Technology (NIT), Warangal conducted a geotechnical appraisal to investigate the temple's unique engineering and structural elements. Significant restoration projects have since been completed for the Nandi Mandapa, while Kameshwara Temple is being rebuilt using original elements.

In November 2024, the Government of India, under the Special Assistant to States for Capital Investment (SASCI) scheme, allocated ₹73 crore (equivalent to ₹78 crore or US$8.3 million in 2026) to the Telangana Government for the temple's restoration and conservation projects.

To preserve historical and natural settings, the temple and its surrounding area are designated as a Conservation Area under the Ancient Monuments and Archeological Sites and Remains (AMASR) Act. The Conservation Area is divided into a 5.93-hectare core zone encompassing the main temple complex and a 66.27-hectare buffer zone that extends 300 meters from the core boundary.

== Location ==
Ramappa temple is located in Palampet, in Venkatapur mandal of Mulugu district. The village lies about 19 kilometres (12 mi) from Mulugu, the district headquarter and about 70 kilometres (43 mi) from Warangal city. The Temple's geographic coordinates are 18°15′32.88″N, 79°56′35.54″E.

The nearest railway station is in Warangal, approximately 70 km from the temple. The nearest airport is in Hyderabad about 150 km away.

== Gallery ==
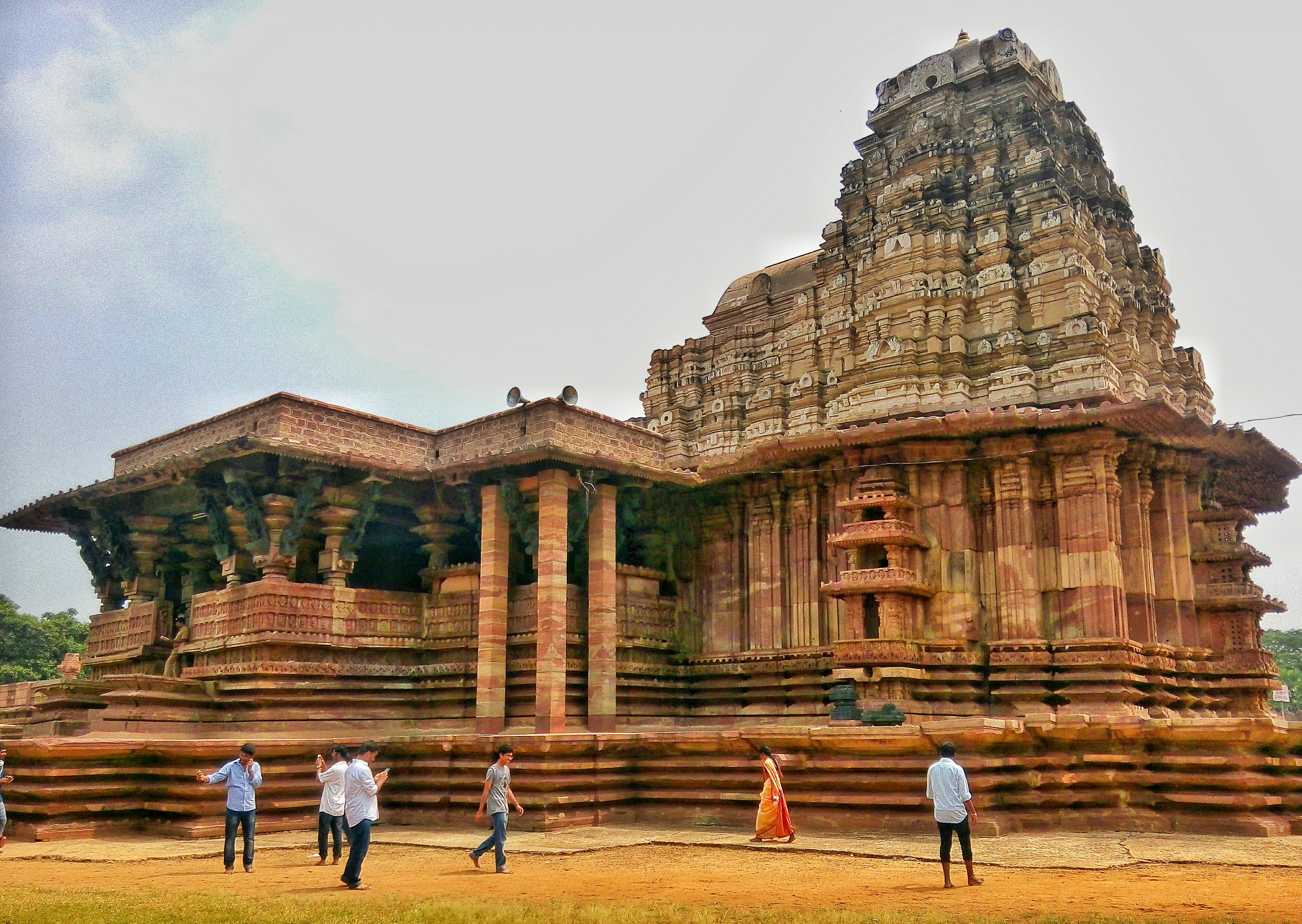
From the side

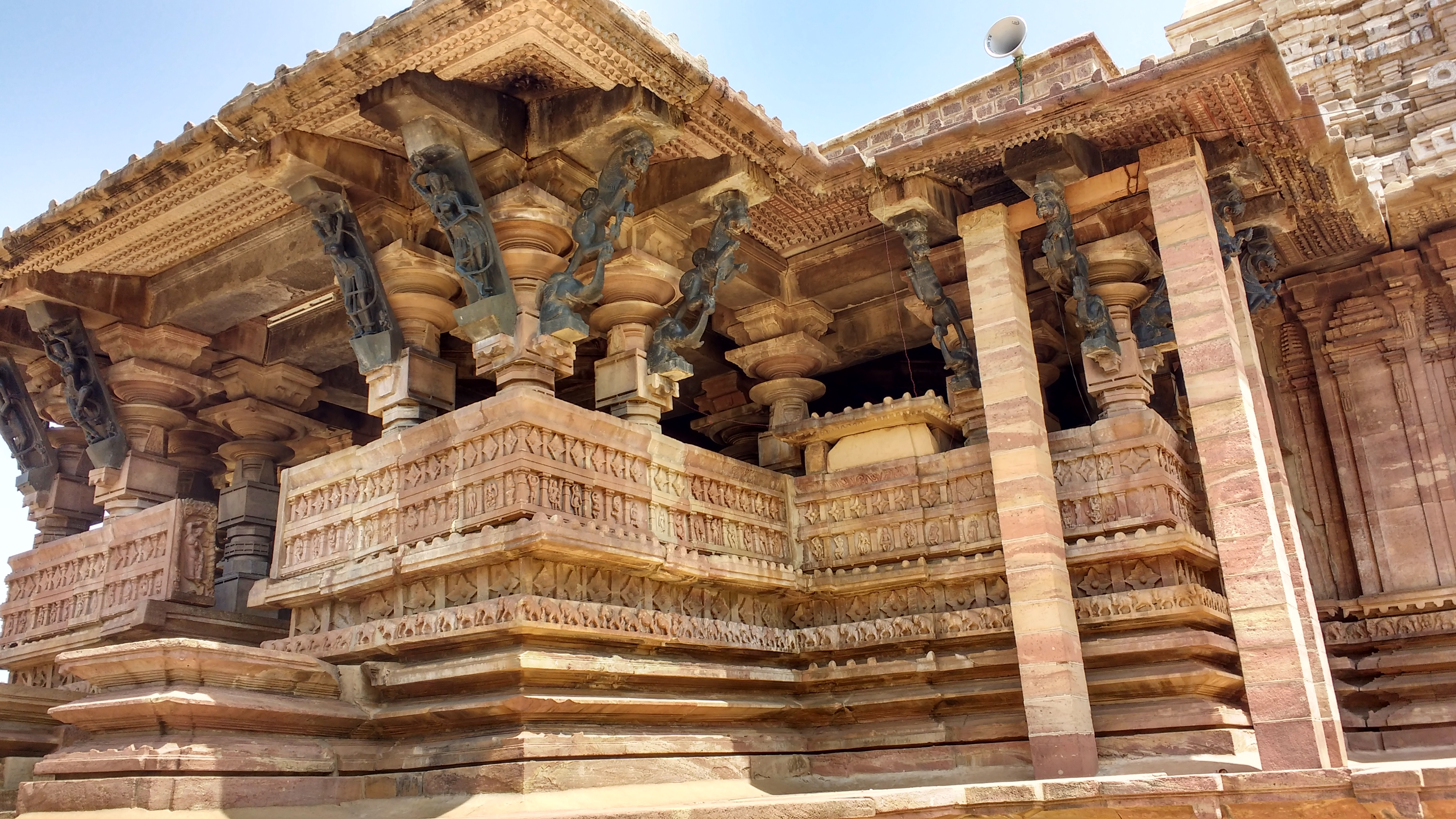

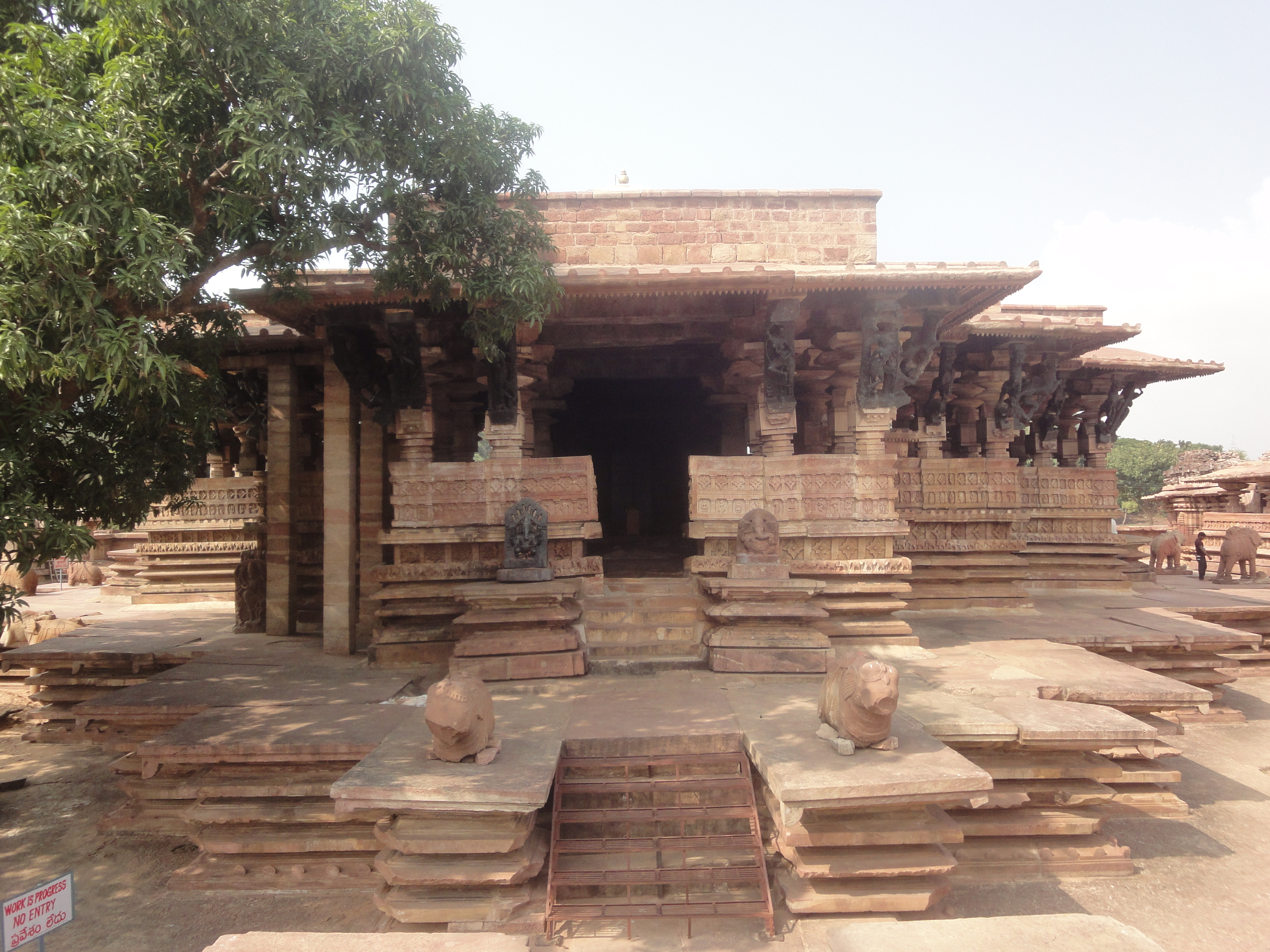
Front

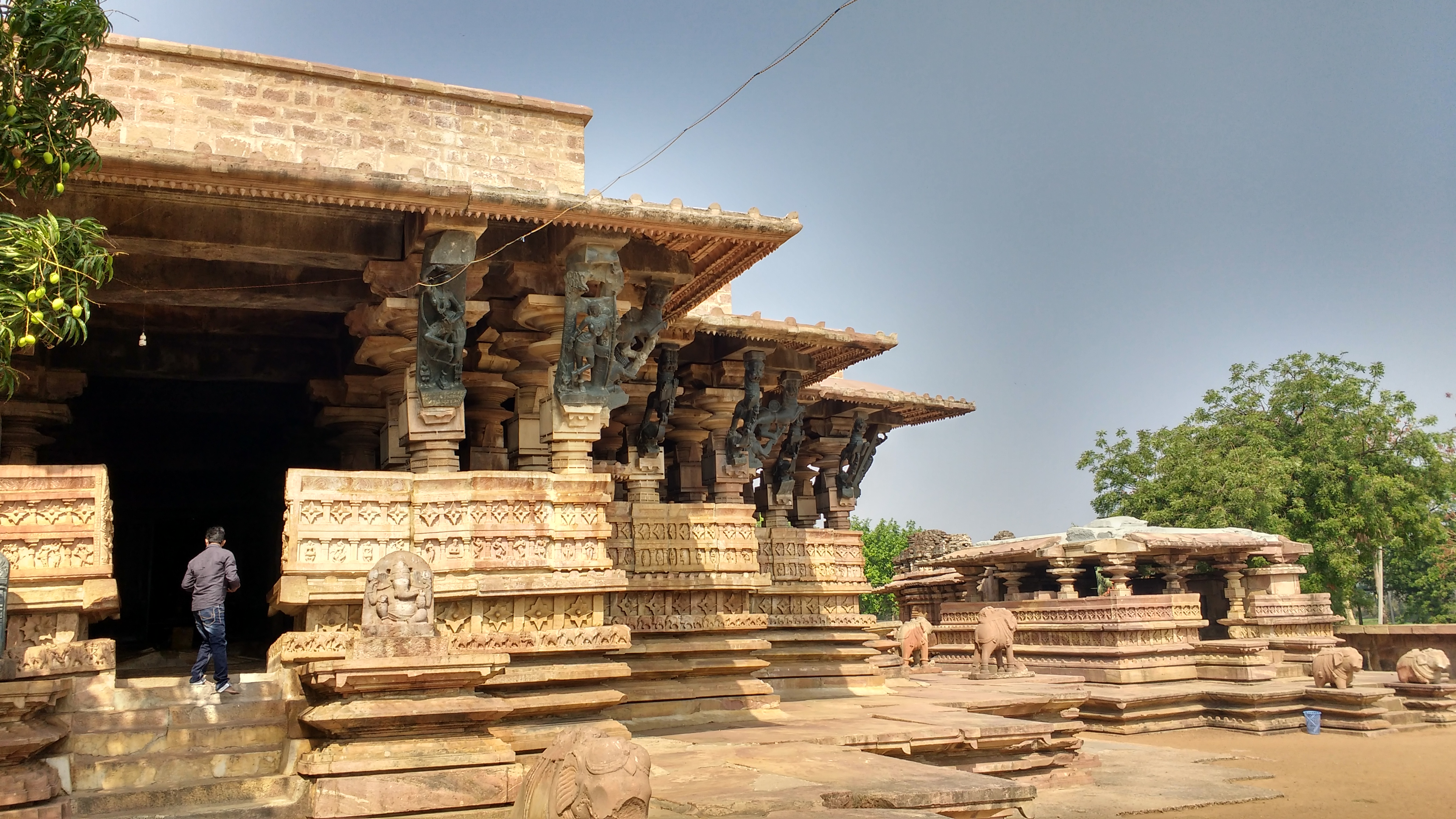

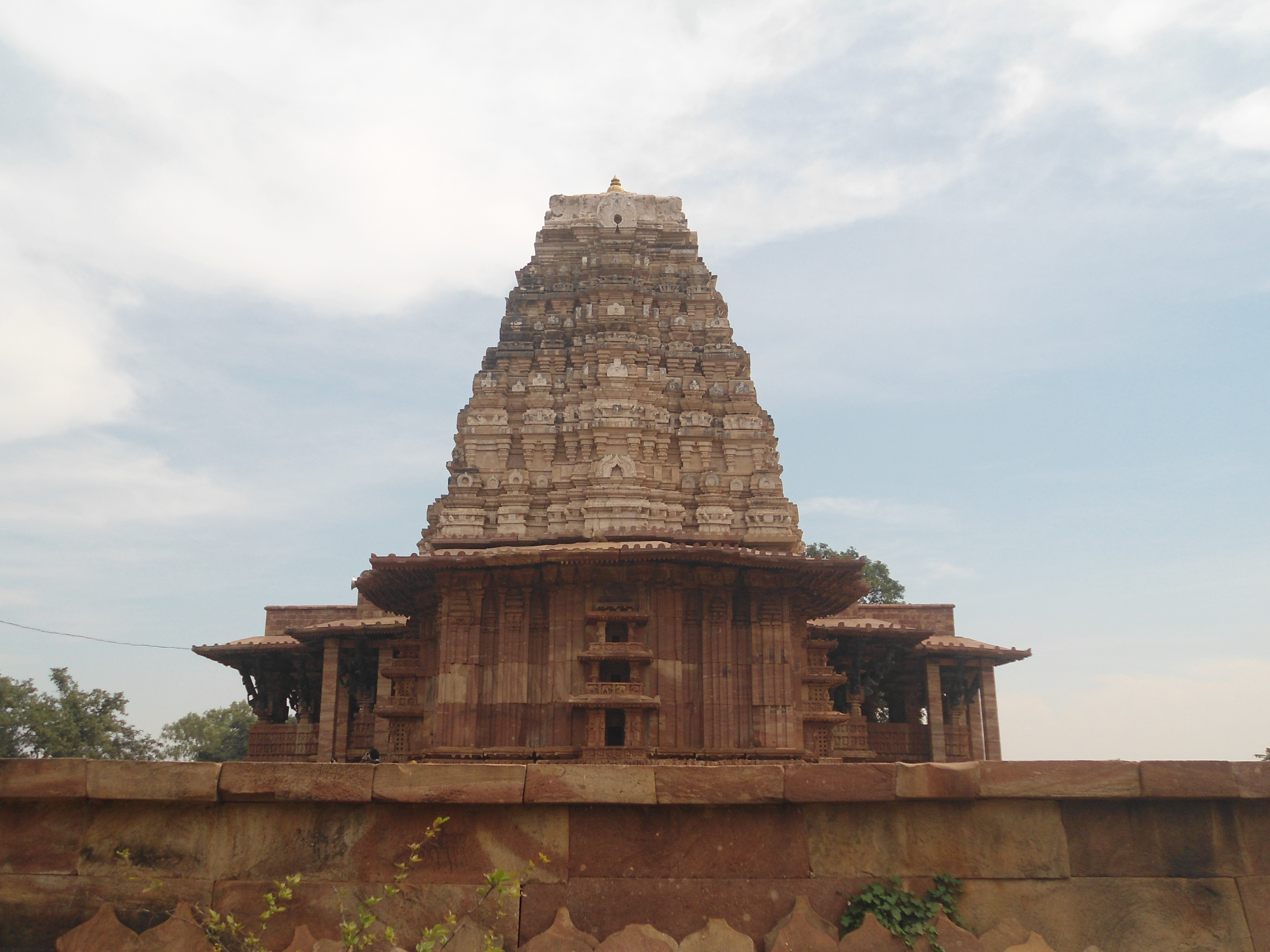
From behind

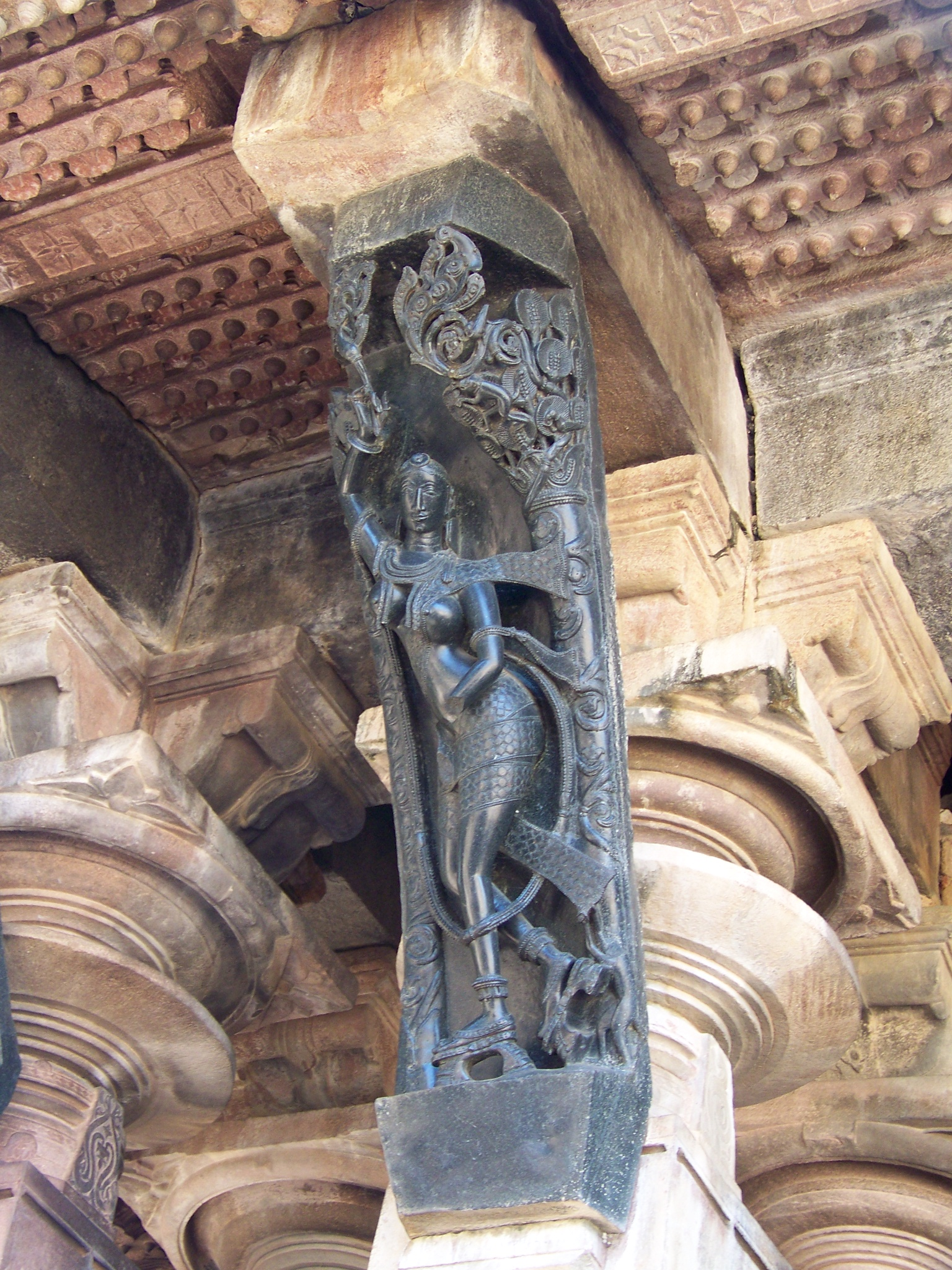
One of the distinctive dancers

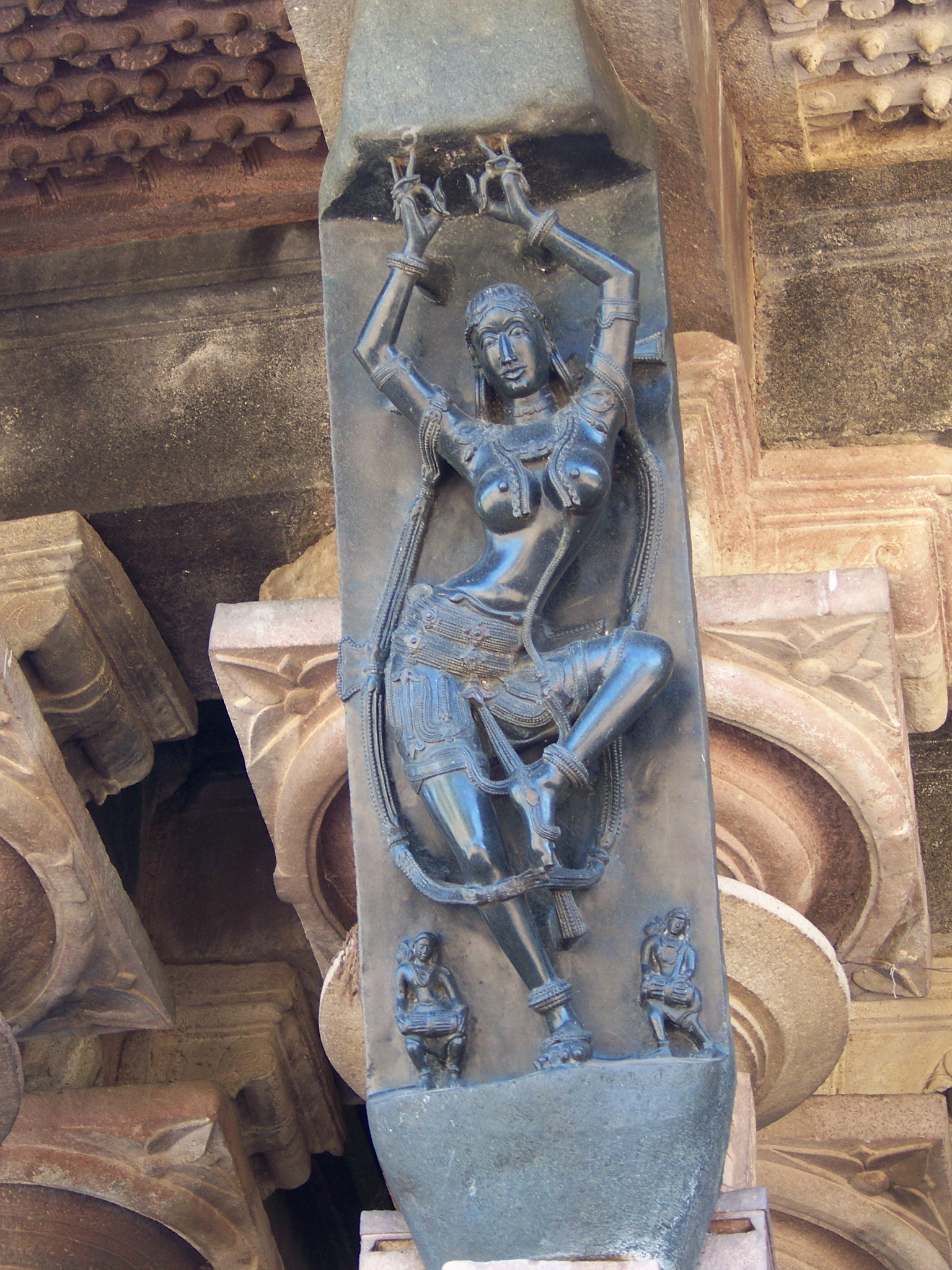
Dancer

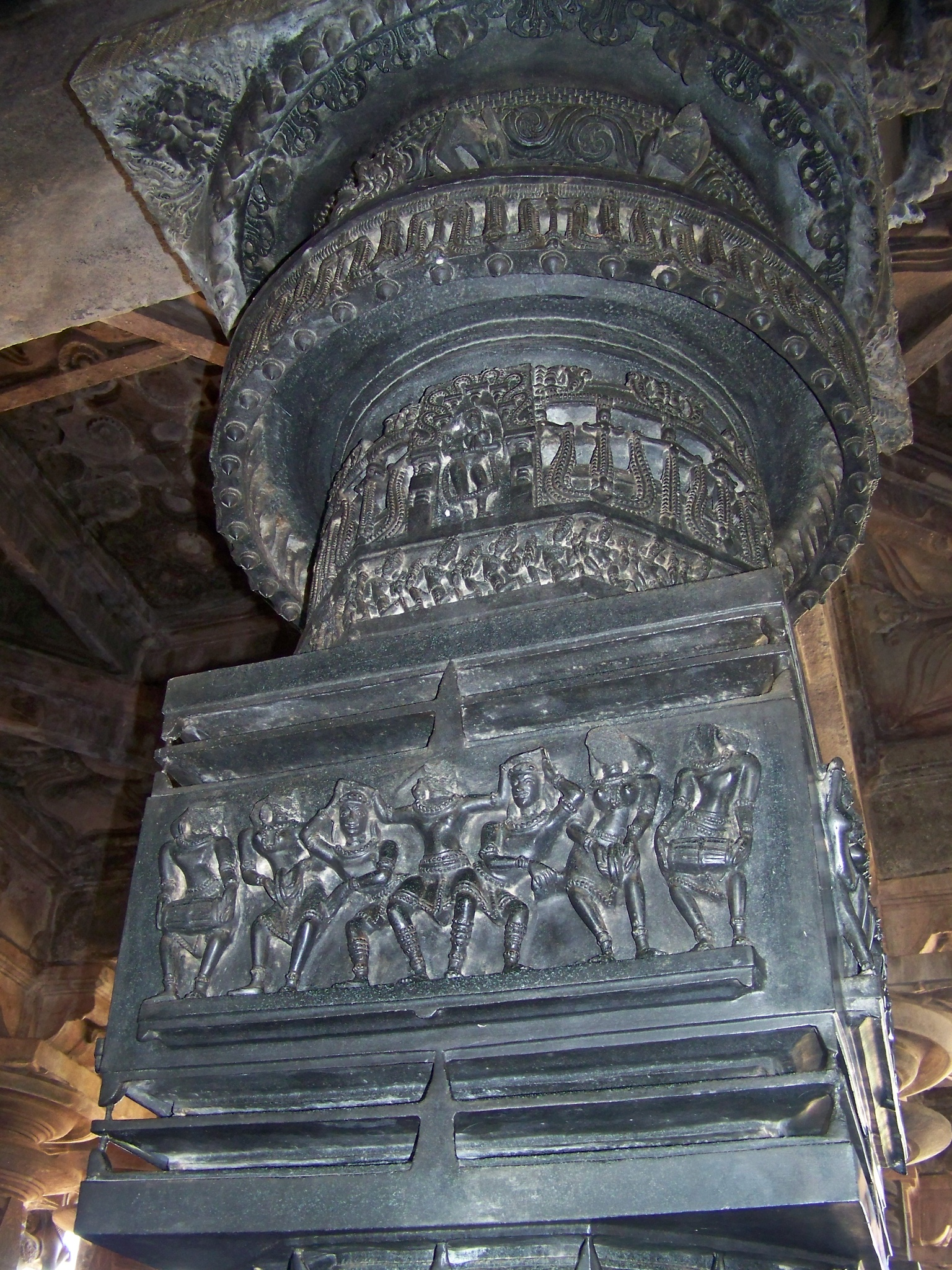
Pillar inside the mandapa

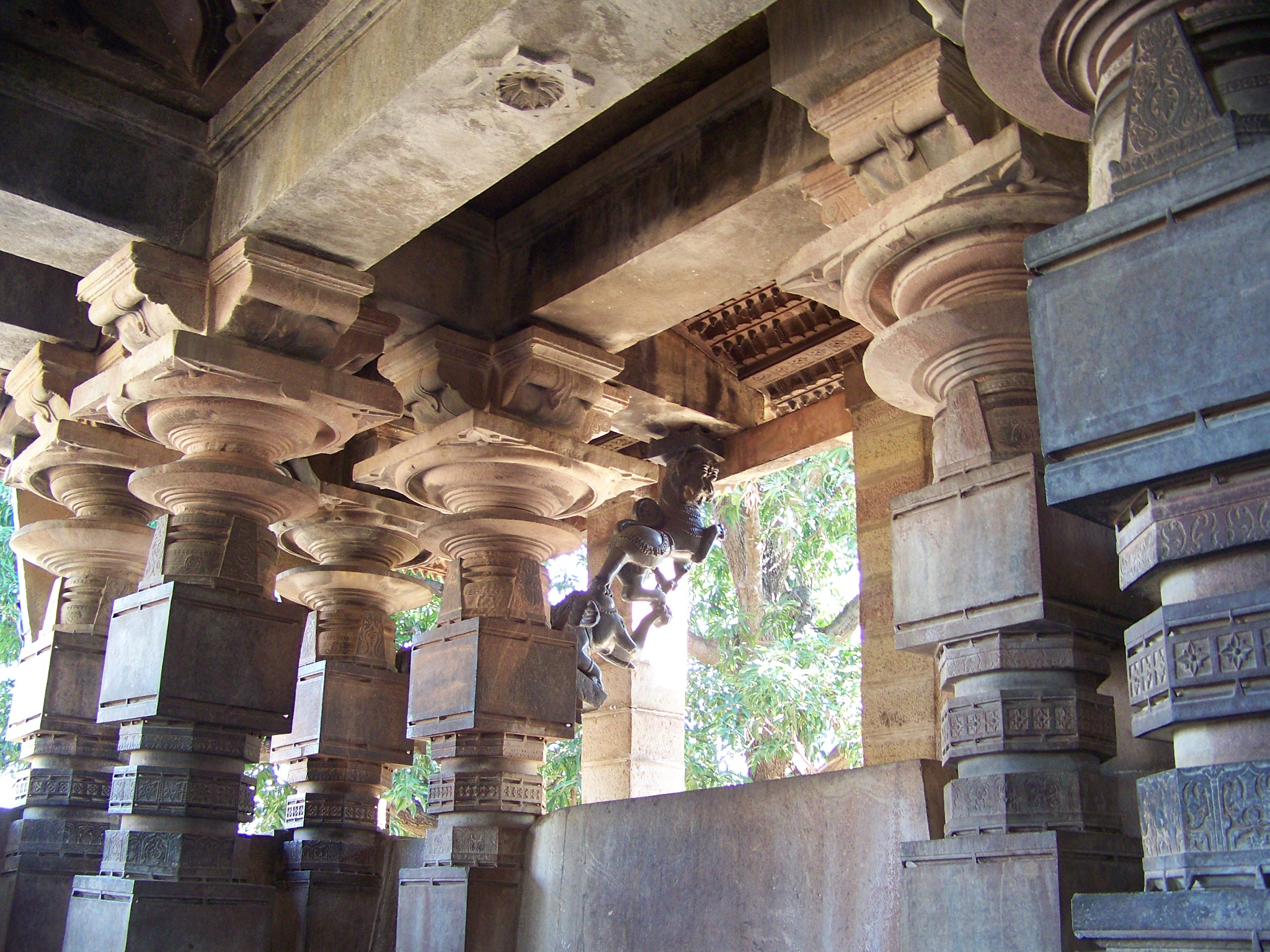
Inside the mandapa

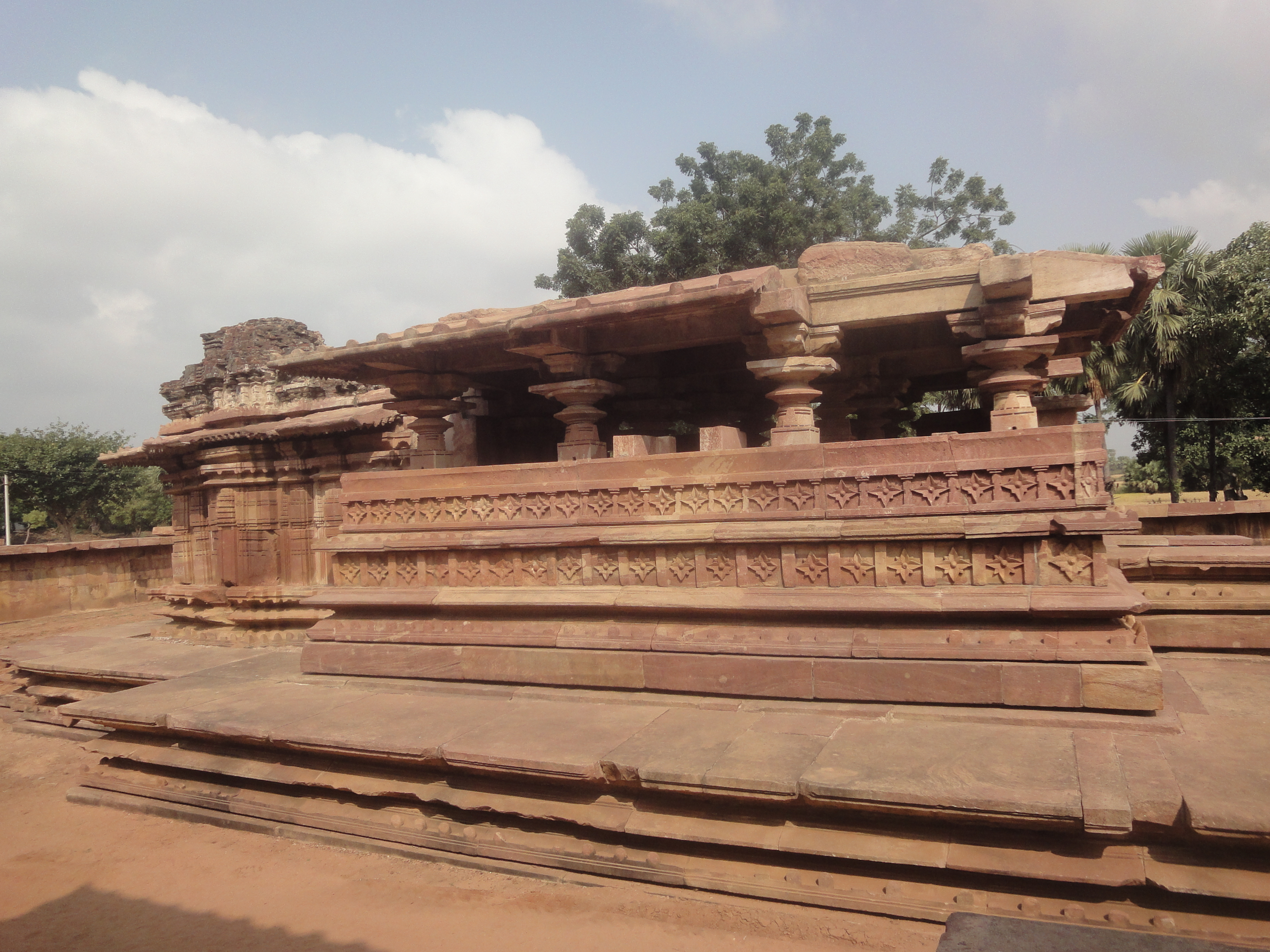
Smaller temple

== See also ==
- Sri Lakshmi Narasimha Swamy Temple, Yadadri
