= Lalgadi Malakpet =

- Village
- Interactive map of Lalgadi Malakpet
- Coordinates: 17.636°N 78.605°E
- Country: India
- State: Telangana

Languages
  - Official: Telugu
- Time zone: UTC+5:30 (IST)
- Telephone code: 040
- Vehicle registration: TS-08 X XXXX
- Sex ratio: 1:1(approx) ♂/♀

Lalgadi Malakpet is a village and gram panchayat in Medchal district, in the Indian state of Telangana. It falls under Shamirpet mandal. A ruined Kakatiya style Shiva temple stands in the village. The Konda Gorre urban park, said to be India's first wilderness park, is set within a 2,635-acre (1,066 ha) forested area.
