= Kakatiya architecture =

Indian building style

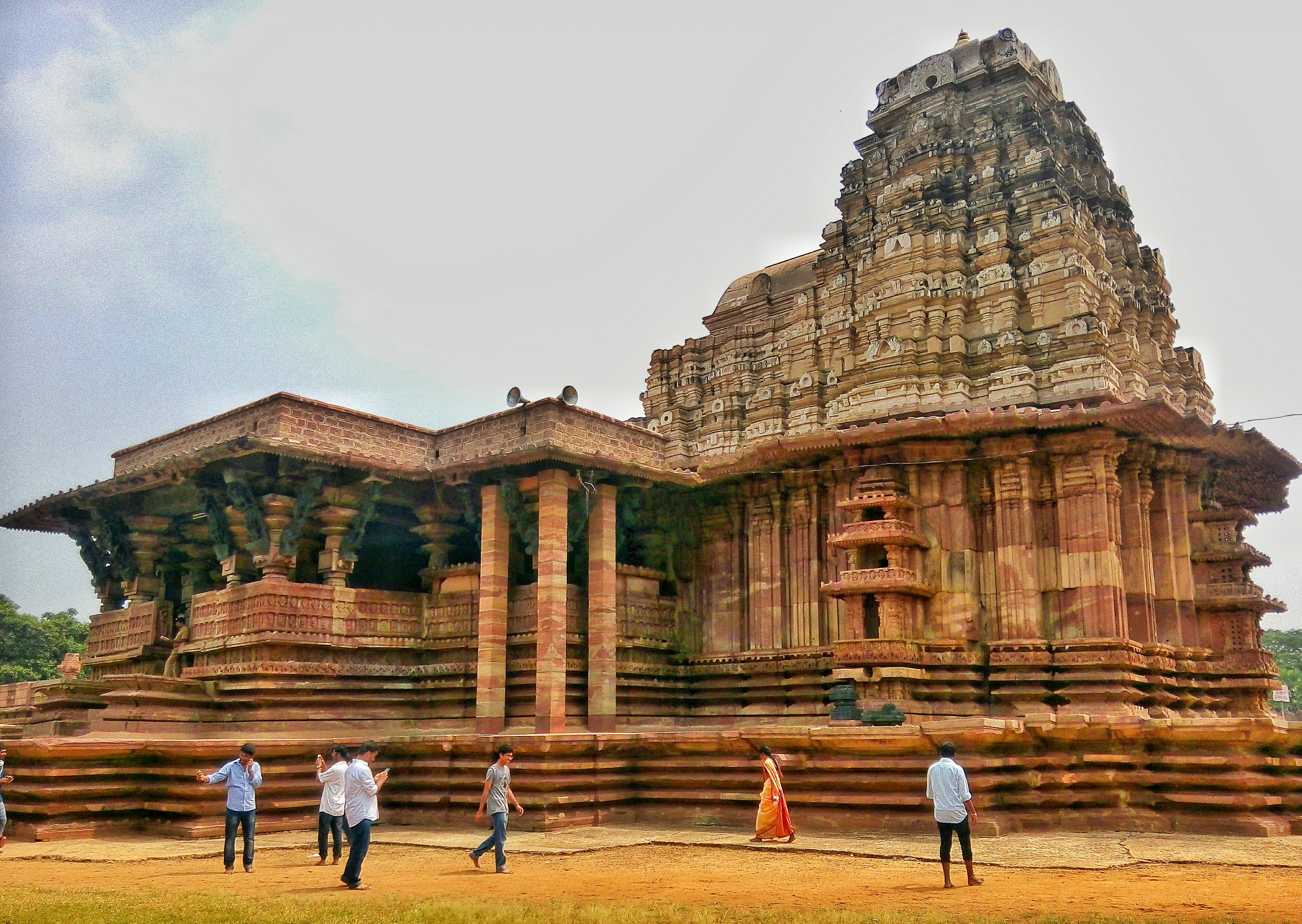
Profile of a Ramappa Temple

Kakatiya architecture was a notable Vesara Architecture Style temple building architecture developed during the rule of the Kakatiya dynasty (1163–1323 CE), in the region comprising present-day Telangana and Andhra Pradesh states of India. The Kakatiya architecture is more significant in Hanamakonda — their first capital and Warangal being their second capital.

Most of the Kakatiya architecture is influenced from Vesara Architecture Style or Chalukya architecture. It is a fusion of Dravidian architecture and Nagara Bhumija styles in which sandbox technology is used to construct Vimana—horizontal stepped tower. There are hundreds of monuments in the core of Hanamakonda and Warangal of which Thousand Pillar Temple, Ramappa Temple, Ramappa Lake, Warangal Fort and Kota Gullu are prominent. The Ramappa Temple, also known as the Rudreswara Temple, is a UNESCO World Heritage Site located at Palampet village in Mulugu district, Telangana.

== Temple architecture ==
Depending on the geographical location the Kakatiya's used both stones and bricks for the construction of temple complexes, there temple plans are of five main designs; 1) Ekakuta 2) Dwikuta 3) TriKuta 4) Chatuskuta and 5) Panchakuta, depending on its geographical alignment all the main temples are facing east, towards the rising sun following the Vastu shastra. Some of the temples premises also consist of Sabha Mandapa, the Nandi Mandapa, Pakashala, Kalyana Mandapa, Ranga Randapa and Dwara Mandapa.

== See also ==
- Architecture of India
- Hindu temple architecture
- Vijayanagara architecture
- Indian rock-cut architecture
