= John Burton-Page =

British orientalist (1921–2005)

John Garrard Burton-Page (19 December 1921 – 2005) was a British orientalist, Lecturer in the Art and Architecture of India at the School of Oriental and African Studies (SOAS). He was an editor, and prolific contributor, to the Second Edition of the Encyclopaedia of Islam between 1960 and 1995.

Burton-Page's contributions to the Encyclopaedia of Islam fell into three main categories: Muslim sites and monuments; Muslim dynasties; and Islamic building typologies. These contributions were reprinted in a posthumous collection edited by his former student George Michell.

== Life ==
John Burton-Page was born in Westcliff-on-Sea, Essex. Though he enrolled as a horn player at the Royal College of Music, his study was interrupted by World War II. He served in India and Burma, ending the war as a captain in the 1st King George V's Own Gurkha Rifles. Having become fluent in Hindi and Nepali, on return to England he entered as a mature student at Wadham College, Oxford to study Sanskrit. After graduating in 1950 he went to the School of Oriental and African Studies as a Temporary Lecturer in Nepali. He stayed at SOAS for over three decades, later as a Lecturer and Reader in Hindi, becoming increasingly interested in Indo-Islamic history and architecture. His final post was as Reader in the Art & Archaeology of South Asia, and he continued to write and teach for some years after his formal retirement.

== Works ==
- 'The Name "Nepal"', Bulletin of the School of Oriental and African Studies 16:3 (1954), p. 592-7.
- 'Two studies in Gungkura, 1. Tone; 2. Rhotacism and retroflexion', Bulletin of the School of Oriental and African Studies 17 (1954), p. 111-9.
- 'An analysis of the syllable in Boro', Indian Linguistics 16 (1956), pp. 334–44
- 'The syntax of participial forms in Hindi', Bulletin of the School of Oriental and African Studies 19 (1957), pp. 94–104.
- 'The charm of Indo-Islamic architecture, an introduction to the modern phase', Bulletin of the School of Oriental and African Studies 19 (1957), pp. 393–4.
- 'Compound and conjunct verbs in Hindi', Bulletin of the School of Oriental and African Studies 19 (1957), pp. 469–78.
- '"Aziz" and the sack of Swarka, a seventeenth century Hindi version', Bulletin of the School of Oriental and African Studies 21 (1957), pp. 145–57.
- 'Notes on two problems in Indo-Aryan', Bulletin of the School of Oriental and African Studies 21 (1957), pp. 174–8.
- 'The gender of loan-words in Hindi', Indian Linguistics 20 (1959), pp. 165–79
- 'A study of fortification in the Indian subcontinent from the thirteenth to the eighteenth century A.D.', Bulletin of the School of Oriental and African Studies 23 (1960), pp. 516–22.
- (ed.) Introduction to Nepali: a first-year language course by Thomas Welcourne Clark, School of Oriental and African Studies, 1977.
- 'An inscription from Ambur fort in the Victoria and Albert Museum', Bulletin of the School of Oriental and African Studies 49 (1986), pp. 174–8.
- (ed. George Michell) Indian Islamic architecture : forms and typologies, sites and monuments, 2007.
