= Ramappa Lake =

Lake in Telangana, India

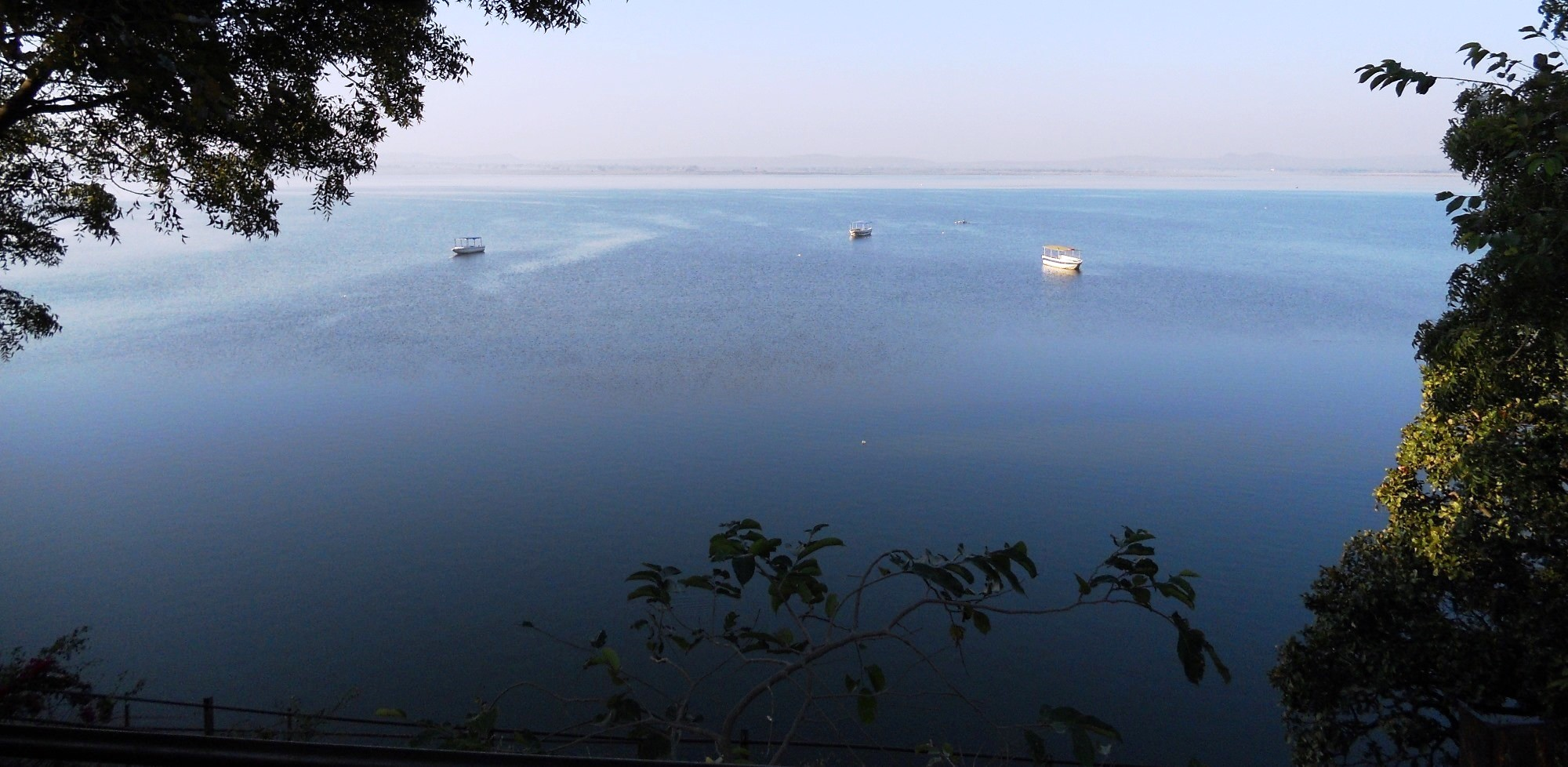
- Ramappa Lake

- Location within Telangana
- Location: Warangal district, Telangana
- Coordinates: 18.238477°N 79.939784°E
- Type: Artificial
- Basin countries: India Telangana
- Shore length^{1}: 56 kilometres (35 mi)
- Settlements: Palampet, Warangal, Hyderabad
- ^{1} Shore length is not a well-defined measure.

Ramappa Lake is a lake situated in Palampeta village, Venkatapur mandal, Mulugu district, Telangana, India. The lake is one of the prominent reservoirs built by Kakatiya rulers.

In 2021, the Telangana Irrigation Department proposed Ramappa Lake for recognition as a World Heritage Irrigation Structure by the International Commission on Irrigation and Drainage.

== Construction ==
Ramappa lake was constructed in 1213 CE by Recherla Rudra, a general and minister under the Kakatiya dynasty during the times of Ganapati (Kakatiya dynasty). The reservoir forms part of wider network of kakatiaya-era irrigation tanks, known locally as cheruvus, that the dynasty built across Telangana to store monsoon runoff for year-round use.

The reservoir has a gross storage capacity of about 2,912 million cubic feet and irrigates approximately 5,180 acres (2,100 ha) of agriculture land in the surrounding villages. Ramappa Lake, like other kakatiaya-era irrigation tanks including Pakhal Lake and Laknavaram Lake, has remained in active use for the last seven centuries.

In 2017, Telangana Irrigation department approved a project to link Ramappa Lake with the nearby Pakhal Lake by constructing 24 kilometer pipeline. The pipeline connects Ramappa Lake to the Dabbavagu stream, which feeds Pakhal Lake. In 2020, a pump house was built at Ramappa Lake, with four motors, each with 5.07 MW capacity. Two of the motors are used to connect Ramappa Lake to Rangaya cheruvus, while the other two motors serve Pakhal Lake.

== Ecology ==
The lake and its surrounding wetland habitat support a diverse group of residence and migratory birds. In 2024, 126 bird species were recorded at the Ramappa Lake.

== Tourist spot ==
The tourism department has proposed the set up of a meditation center on the banks of the lake.
