= Pillalamarri (disambiguation) =

Pillalamarri may refer to one of the following pages:

- Pillalamarri, an 800-year-old banyan tree located in Mahabubnagar, Telangana, India.
- Erakeswara Temple, Pillalamarri, a 13th century Siva temple in Pillalamarri village of Suryapet district of Telangana, India.
- Nameswara Temple, Pillalamarri, a 13th century Siva temple in Pillalamarri village of Suryapet district of Telangana, India.
