= Erakeswara Temple, Pillalamarri =

Hindu temple in India

Erakeswara Temple
- ఎఱకేశ్వర దేవాలయం
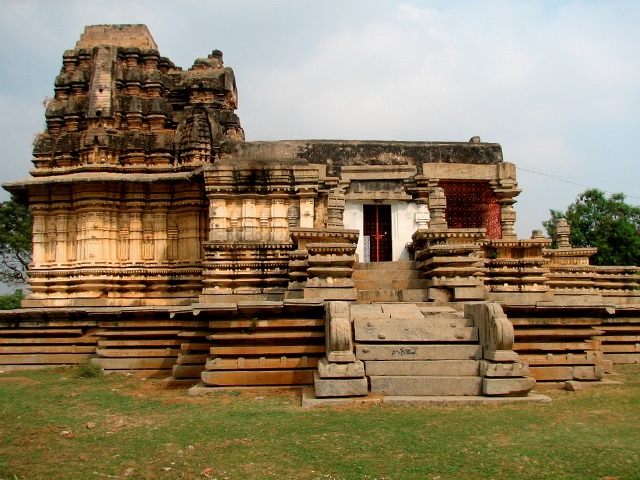

- Location in Telangana

Religion
- Affiliation: Hinduism
- District: Suryapet

Location
- Location: Pillalamarri, Suryapet
- State: Telangana
- Country: India
- Coordinates: 17.169683°N 79.582198°E

Architecture
- Type: Kakatiya architecture
- Completed: c. 1208 CE

The Erakeswara Temple (Telugu: ఎఱకేశ్వర దేవాలయం) is a Hindu Saivite temple located in the western side of Pillalamarri, in the Suryapet district, of Telangana, India. The temple was built on the banks of the Musi river in c. 1208 CE. It was commissioned by Erakasani, the wife of Bēti Reddi of the Recherla Reddis family, who were feudatories of Kakatiyas. The Erakeswara Temple is one among the four prominent and intricately carved stone and granite temples located in Pillalamarri—the other three are about 250 metres east of the Erakeswara temple. These include the double temples next to each other: Nameswara Temple and Trikuteswara Temple (both Shaivite temples); and the third being the Chennakesava Temple (Vishnu) in ruins that is a few hundred feet southwest of the double temples. They are all from 12th to early 13th century period.

== Location ==
Pillalamarri is 8 kilometres northwest of Suryapet, off National Highway 65. Suryapet is 153 kilometres away from Hyderabad on the National Highway 65.

== History ==
Pillalamarri of Suryapeta once functioned as the central seat of power for the Recherla Reddy rulers. While most people recognise Recherla Rudra Reddy for his role in building famous Ramappa Temple, the magnificent group of temples in Pillalamarri were actually established by his paternal half-uncles and their wives. The Erakeshwara temple was built in the early 13th century (c. 1203–1208 CE) by the Recherla chiefs, who served as feudatories of Kakatiyas. One inscription notes that Erakasani, the wife of Bēti Reddi of the Recherla family, commissioned the construction of the temple in 1208 CE in Pillalamarri. The deity Erakeswara is named after her, meaning "lord of Eraka." The temple was vandalised during the raids of Alauddin Khilji into the Deccan region in the early 14th century. An inscription dated to 1357 CE records the re-establishment of Lord Erakeswara by a local feudatory chief serving Kapaya Nayaka of Musunuri Nayaka dynasty.

The genealogy chart of the Recherla Reddy family published by Parabrahma Shastry mentions that Beti Reddy and Erakasani had two sons by the name Malla Reddy and Loki Reddy. However, Utukuru and Yedlapalli inscriptions of Nalgonda mention Loki Reddy being son of Beti Reddy's other wife Bollasanamma.

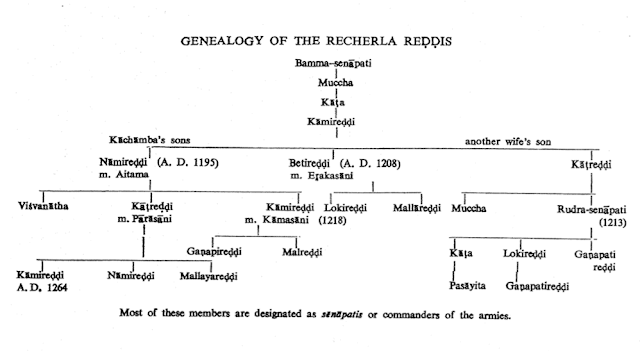
Family Tree of Recherla Reddy Chiefs

Prominent stone inscriptions in Telugu about the history of the temple and of Pillalamarri are displayed in the temple premises. One of the stone inscriptions is dated to 1195 CE (Saka. 1117) and mentions the rule of Pratapa Rudra I. Another stone inscription dates to 1208 CE (Saka. 1130) and makes a reference to the reign of Ganapati Deva.

One of the earliest archaeological surveys and documentation of this temple was completed over 1926 and 1927 by Ghulam Yazdani – an archaeologist and epigraphist, and published in 1929. In this study, the four temples at Pillalamarri were in ruined state and incorrectly named:

- Someswara Gudi (now identified as Erakeswara Temple or Yerakeswara)
- Narasimhadeva temple (now Nameswara temple)
- Mukandesvara temple (now Trikuteswara temple)
- Rameswara temple (now Chennakesava temple)

According to Yazdani, the temple in the northwest part of the village (Someswara, now Erakeswara) has several inscriptions, but some were modern. The Hindu masons of the medieval period had miscalculated the weights and this, he proposed, was the cause of the ruins and sunken floors he witnessed. The local ruler, patron and the builder of this and two other temples in the village was the Namireddi family, a Reddy by caste according to the genealogy inscribed on the stone in one of the temples, states Yazdani.

== Architecture ==
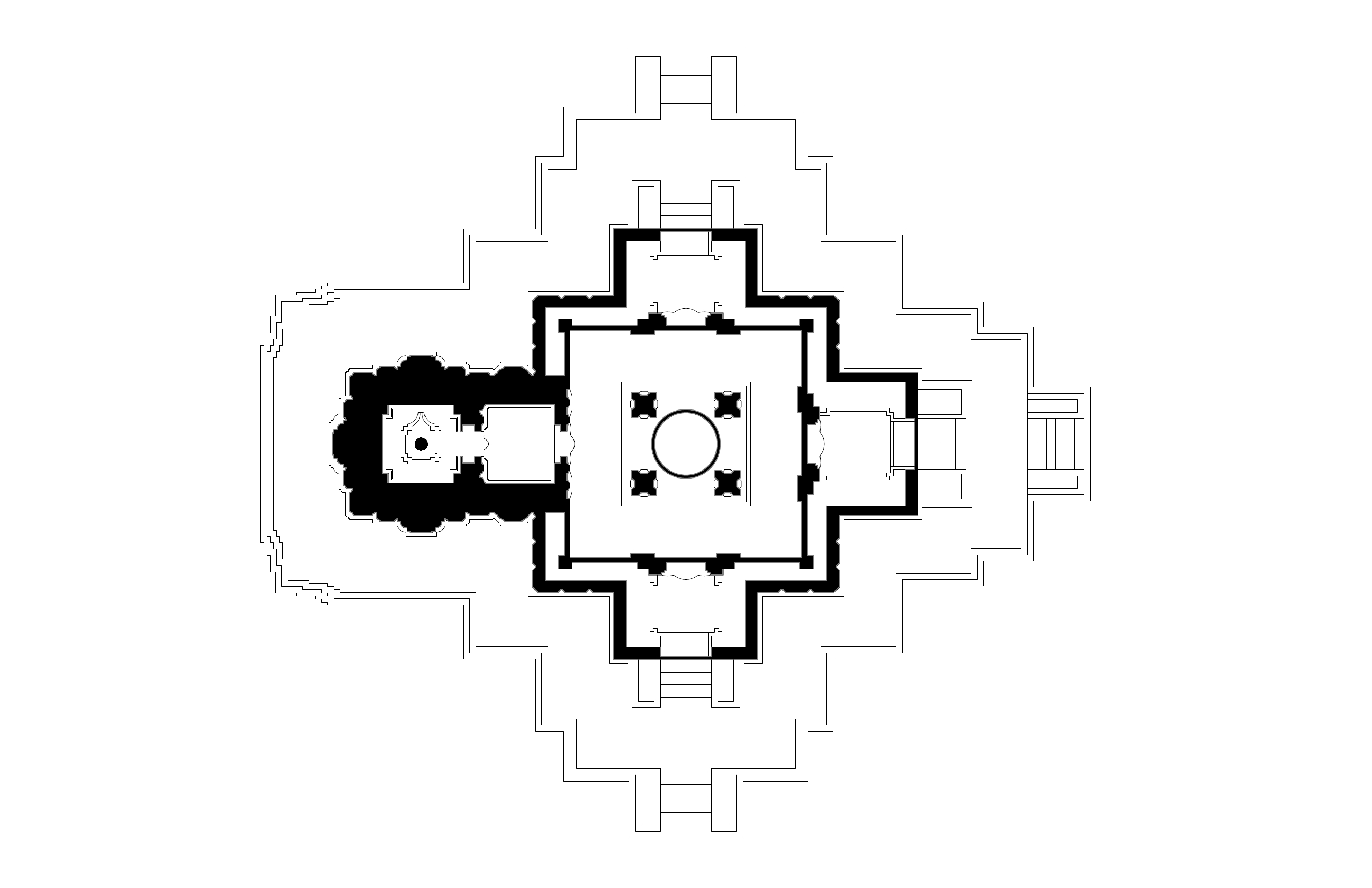
Floor plan of the Erakeswara temple, Pillalamarri

The architectural style of the temple is close to Ramappa temple and Kota Gullu, other Kakatiya era temples. The temple is placed on an upapitha and is cruciform in shape. It has three porticos in the east, north and south and a garbhalaya in the west. The sikhara on the inner sanctum (garbhagudi) is made of brick and lime and is decorated all over by miniature turrets. It is said that the stone used in temple construction has interesting acoustic properties. When the temple stone is tapped with a coin, it sounds like metal. The temple has intricately carved pillars and walls. The temple walls are painted with frescoes.

== Gallery ==
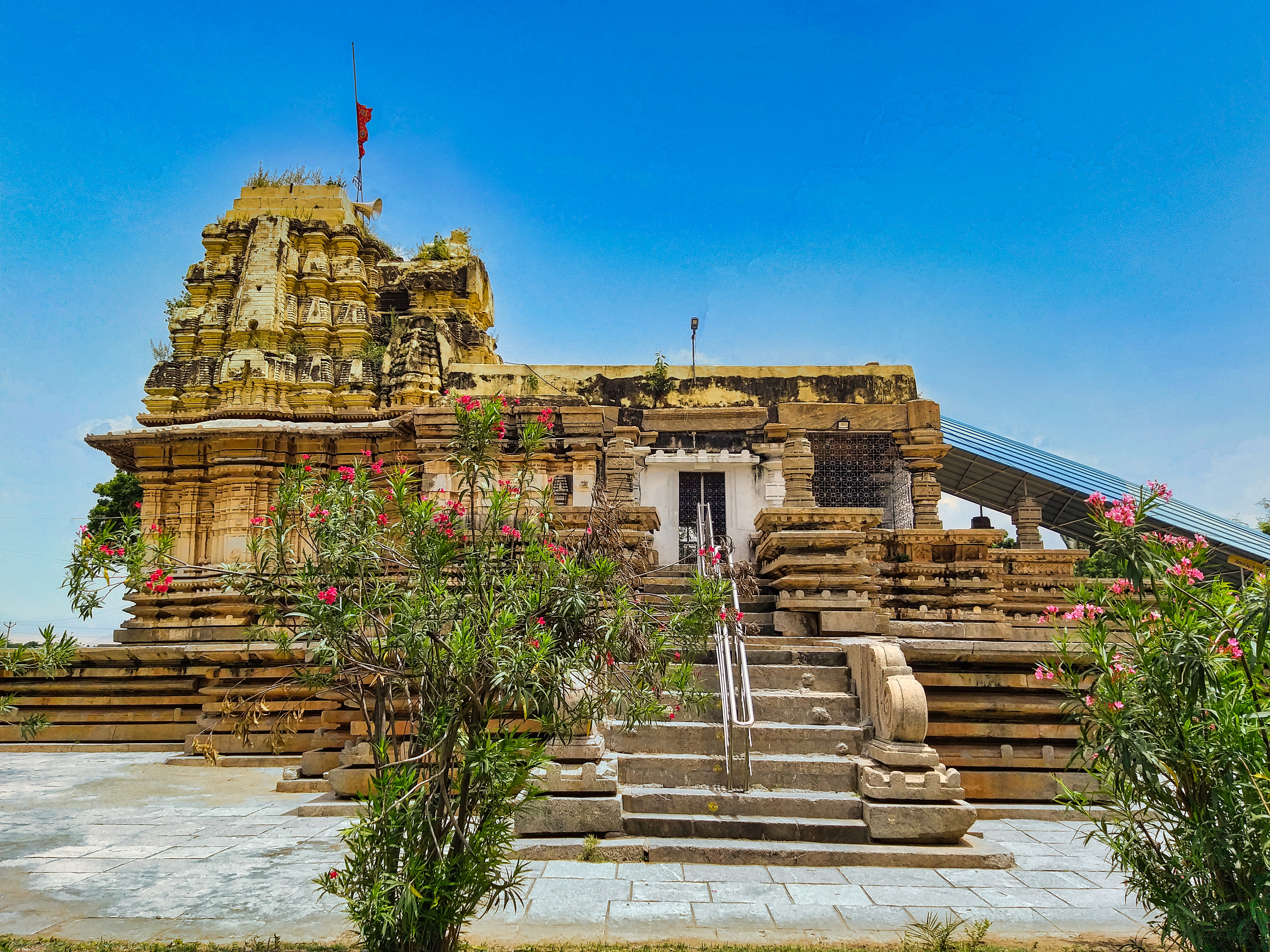

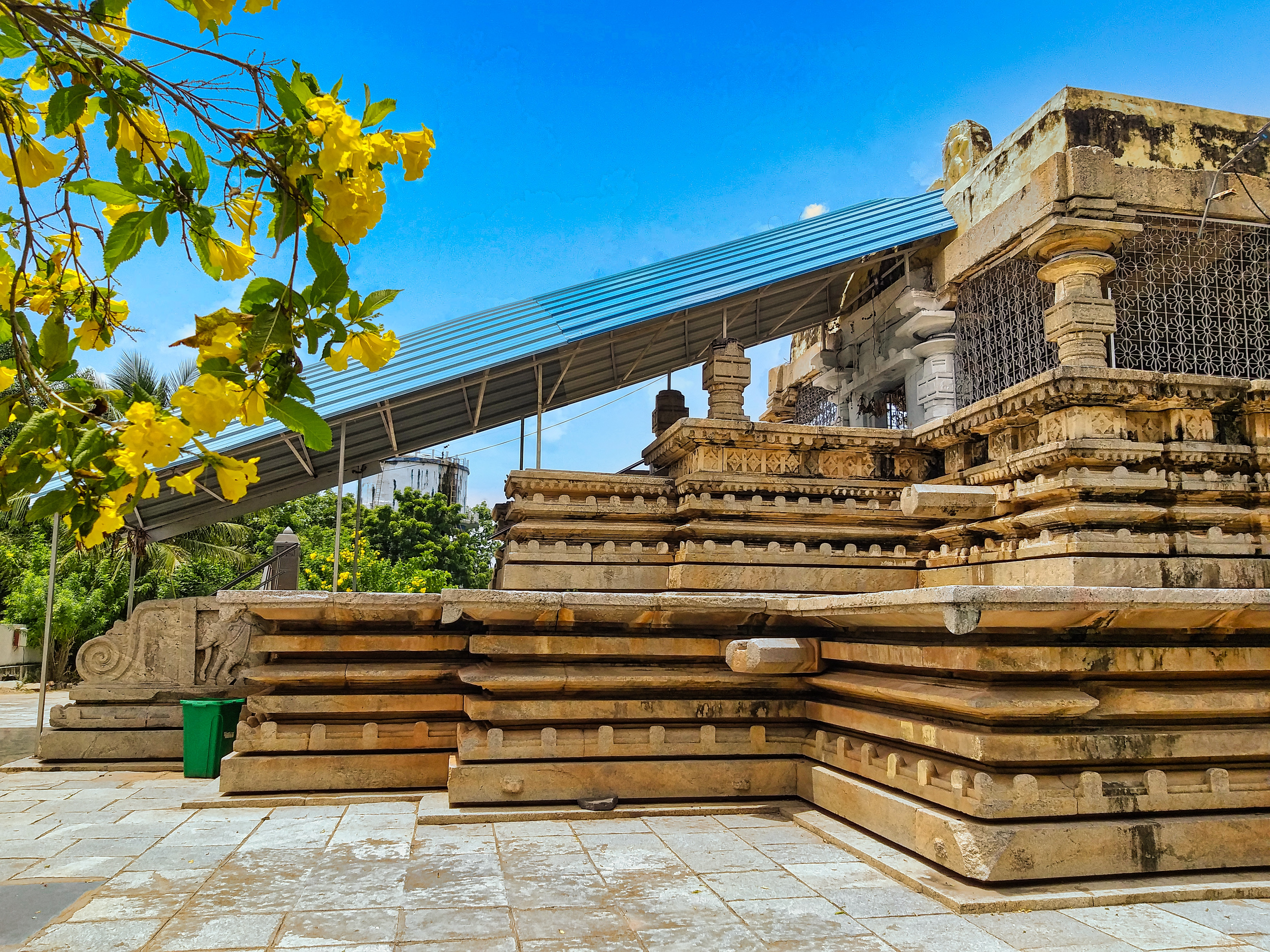

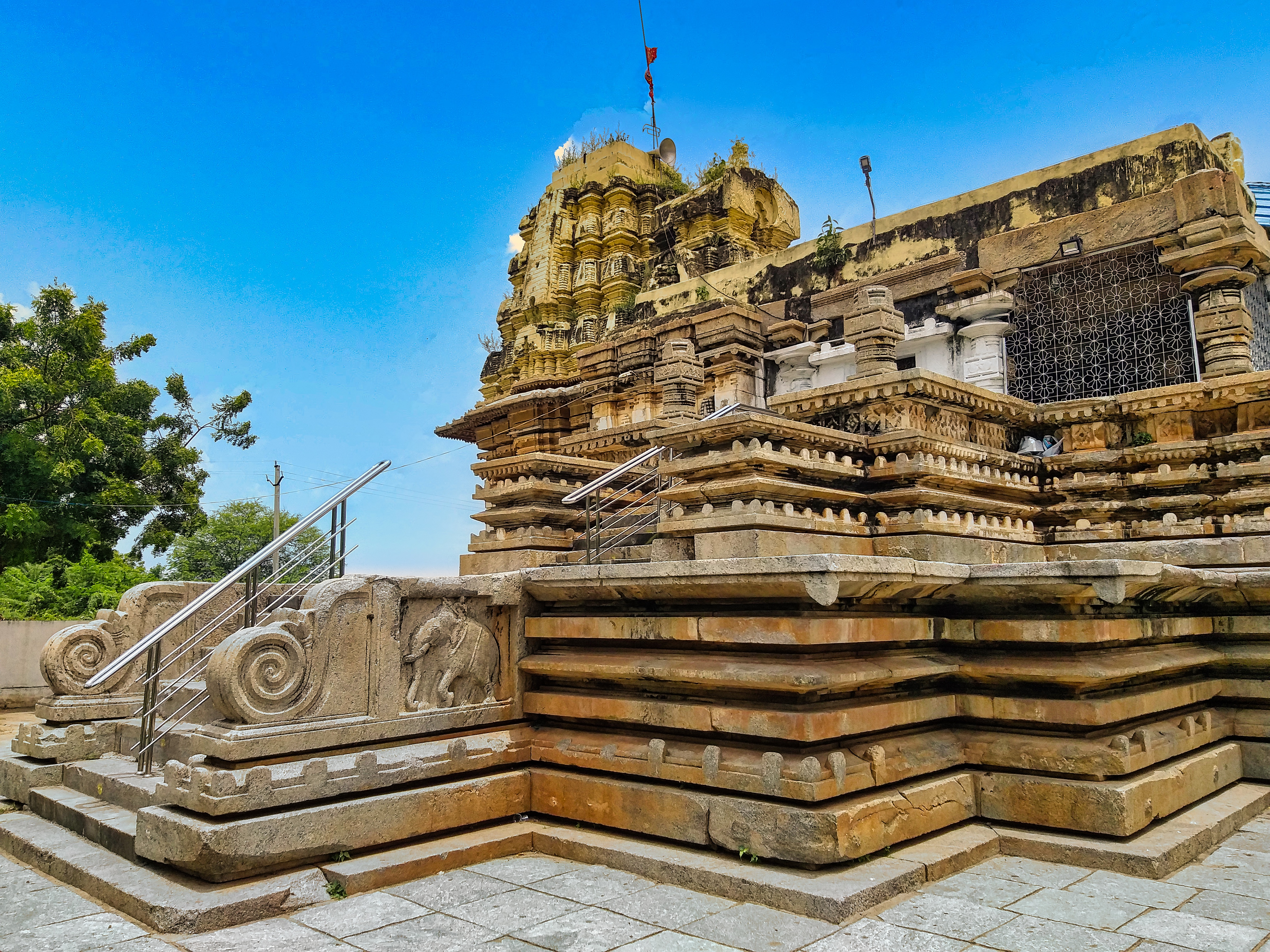

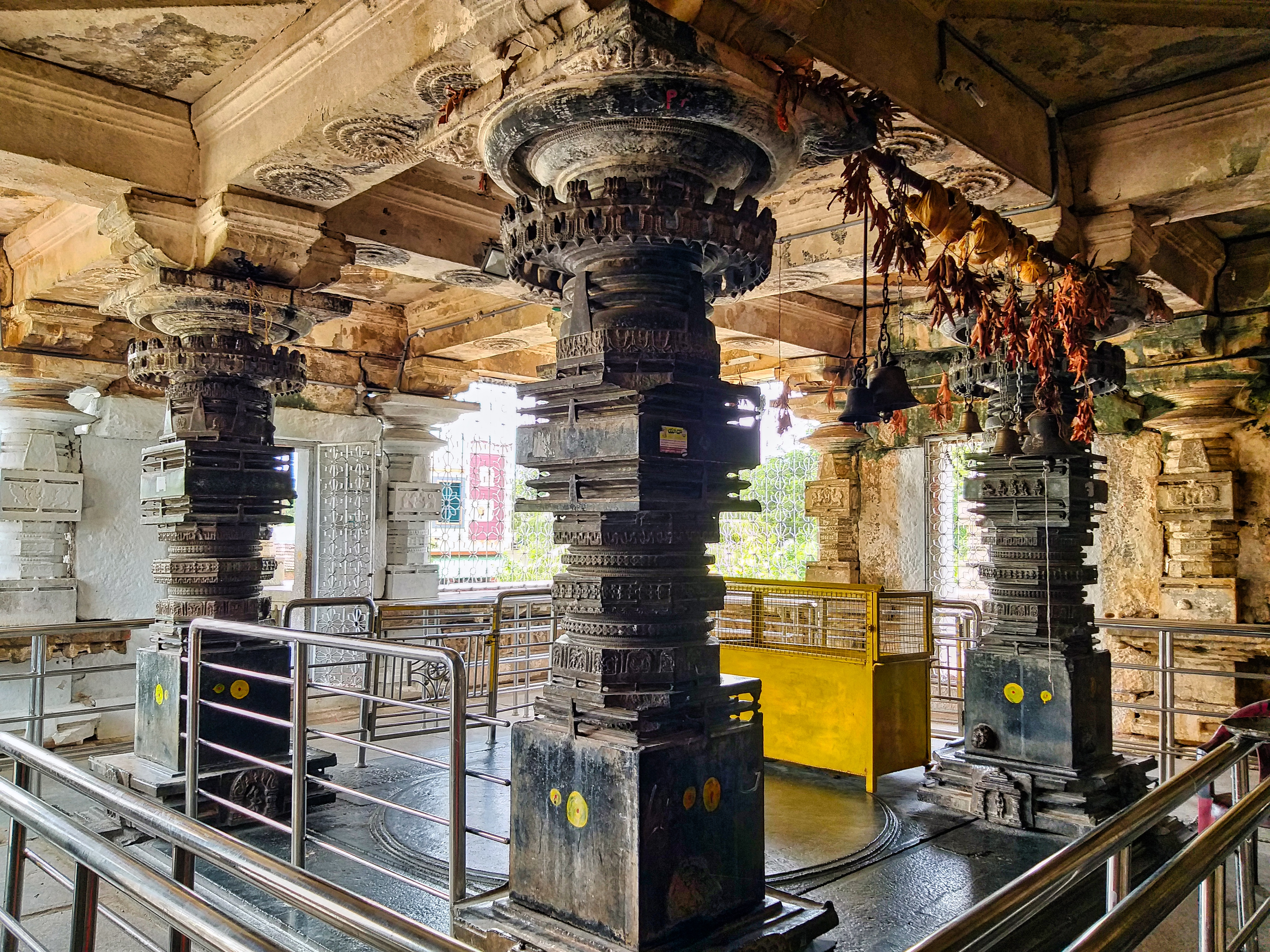

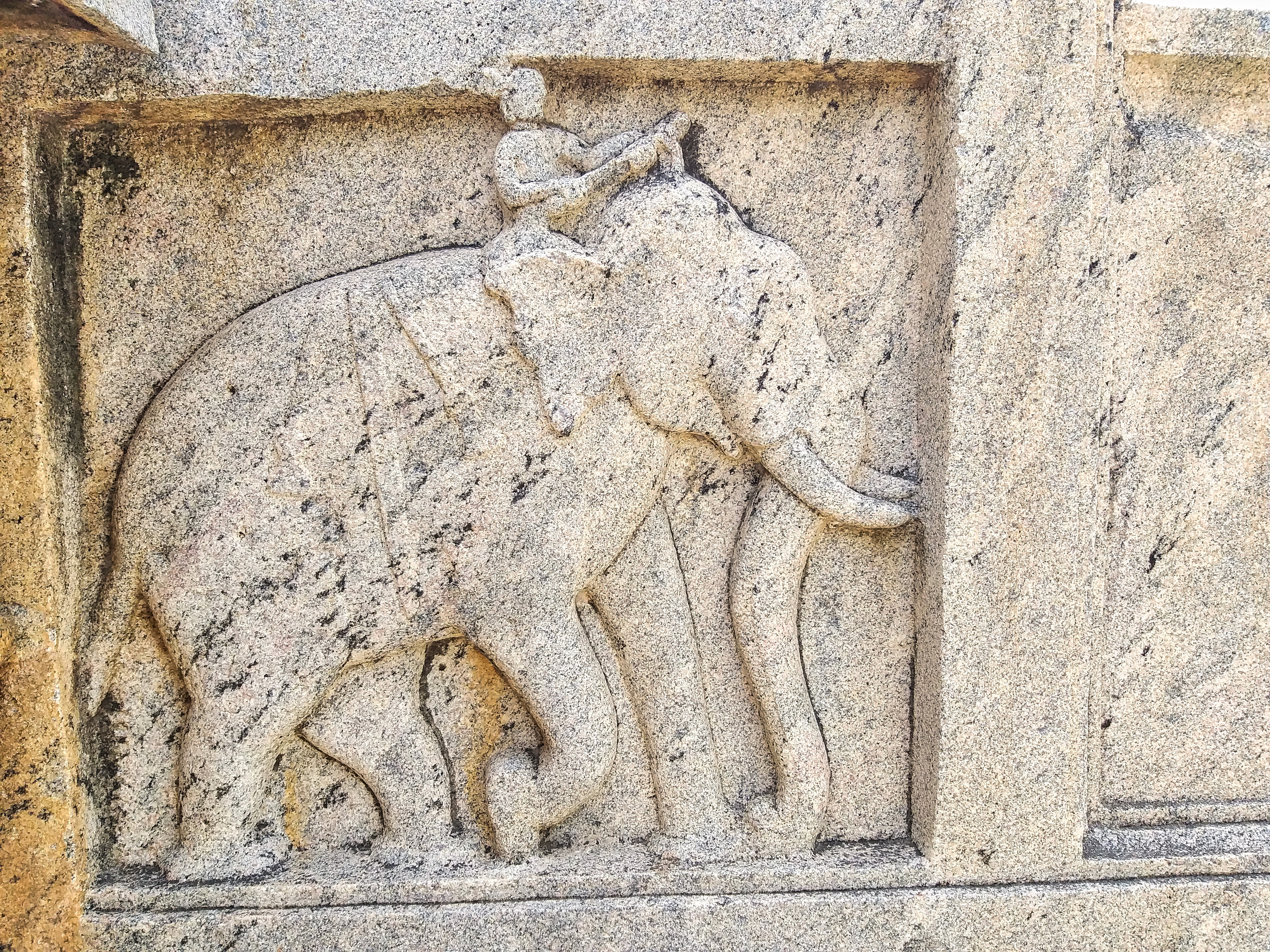

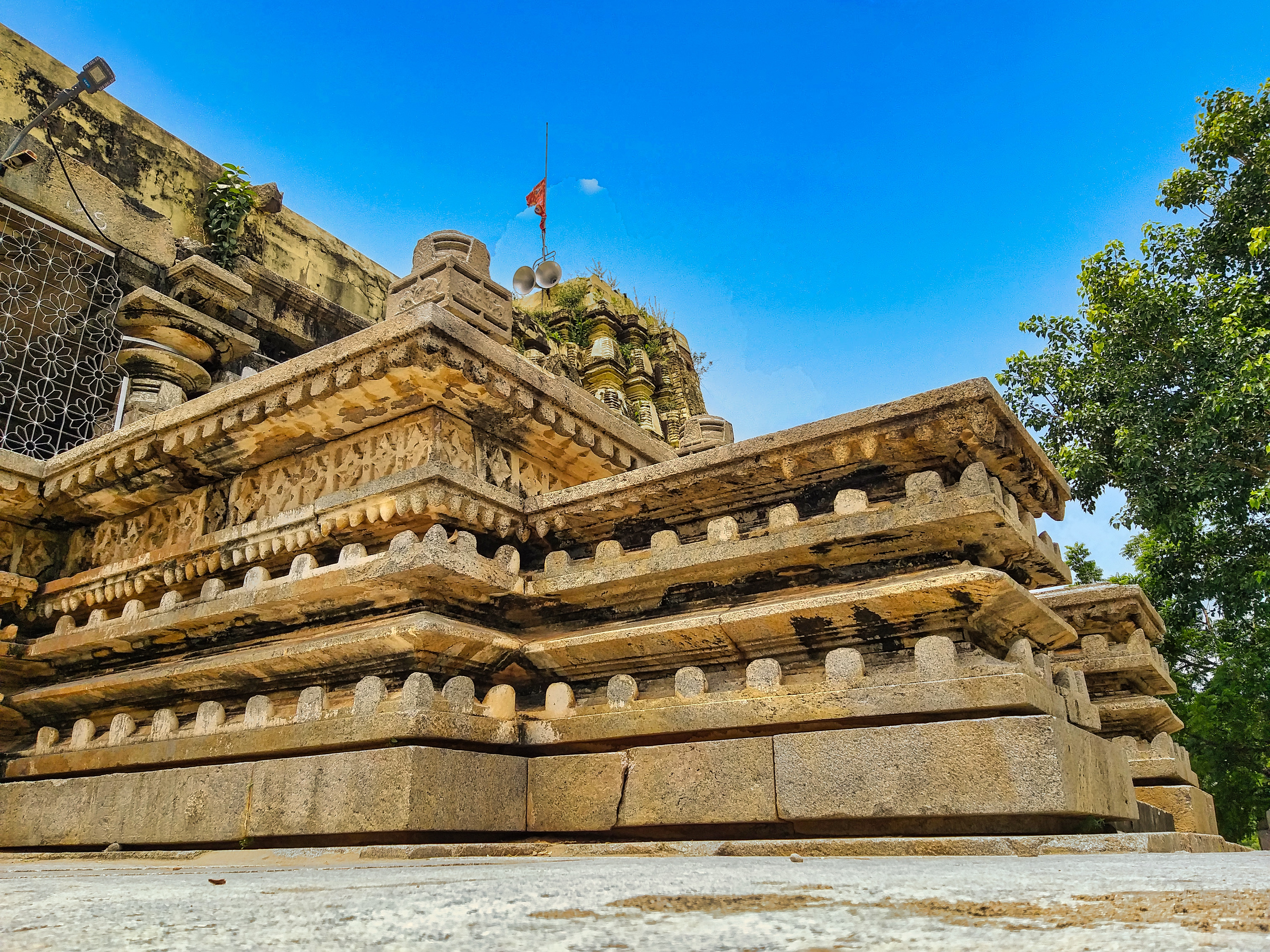

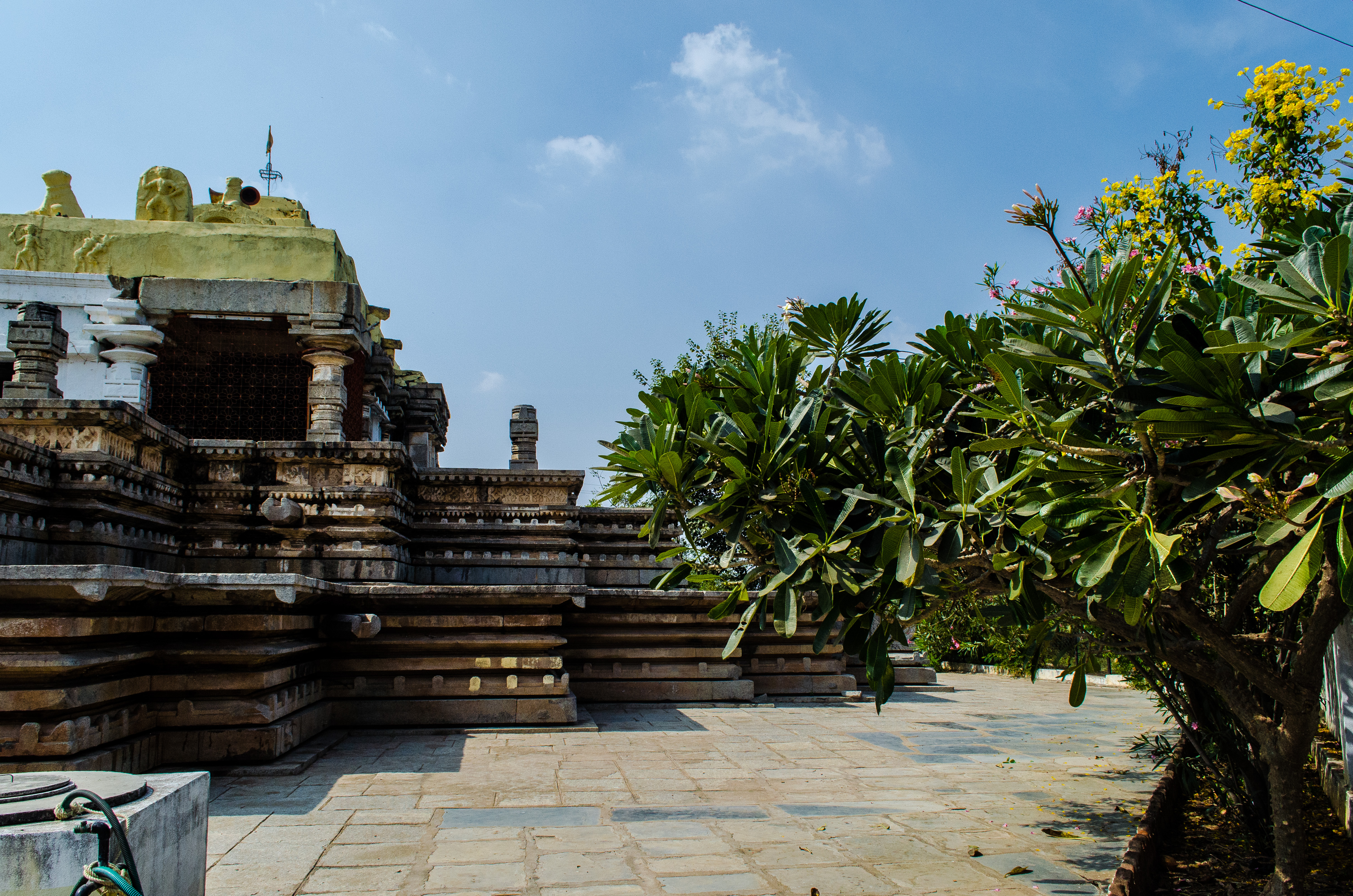

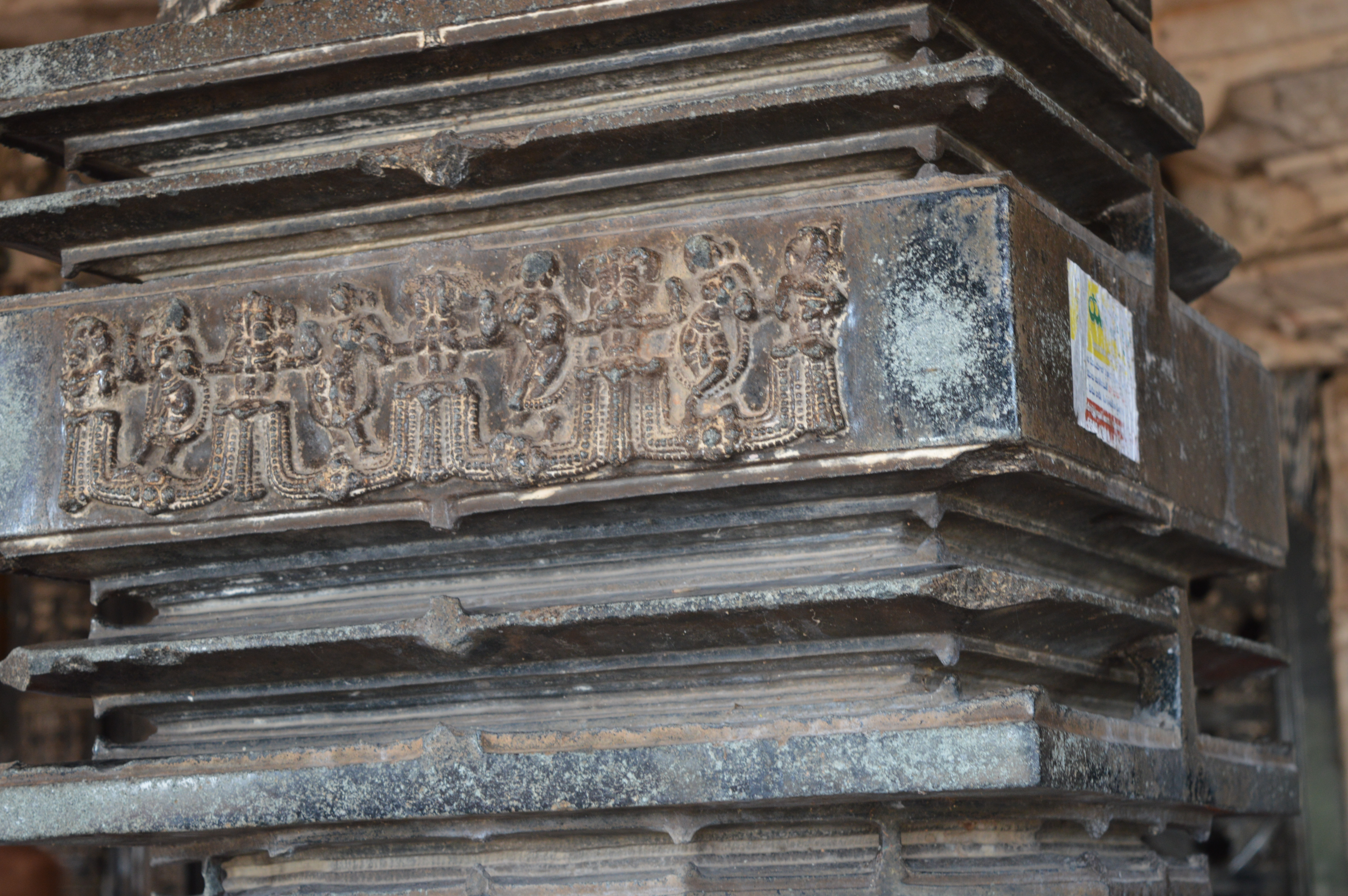

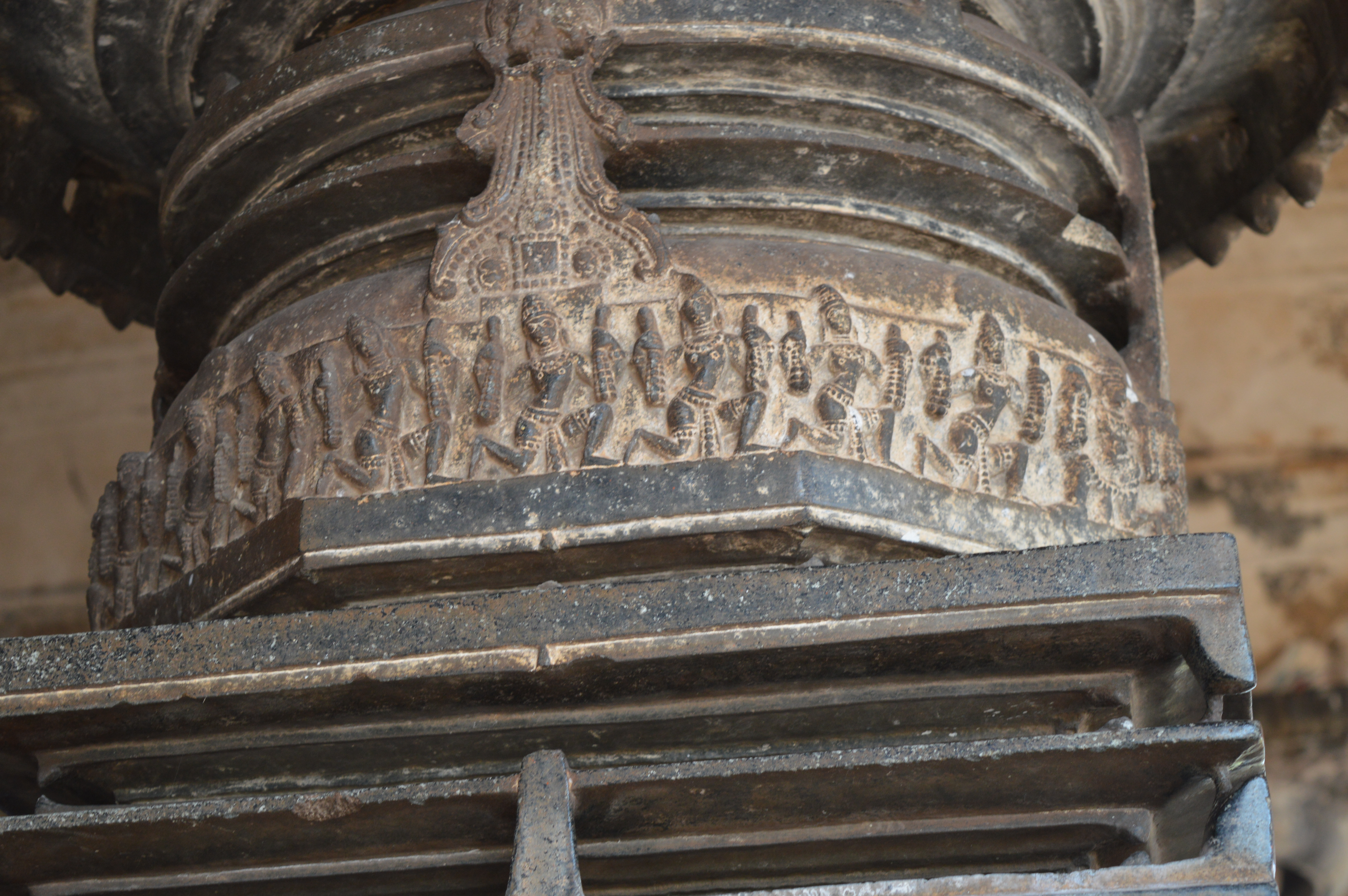

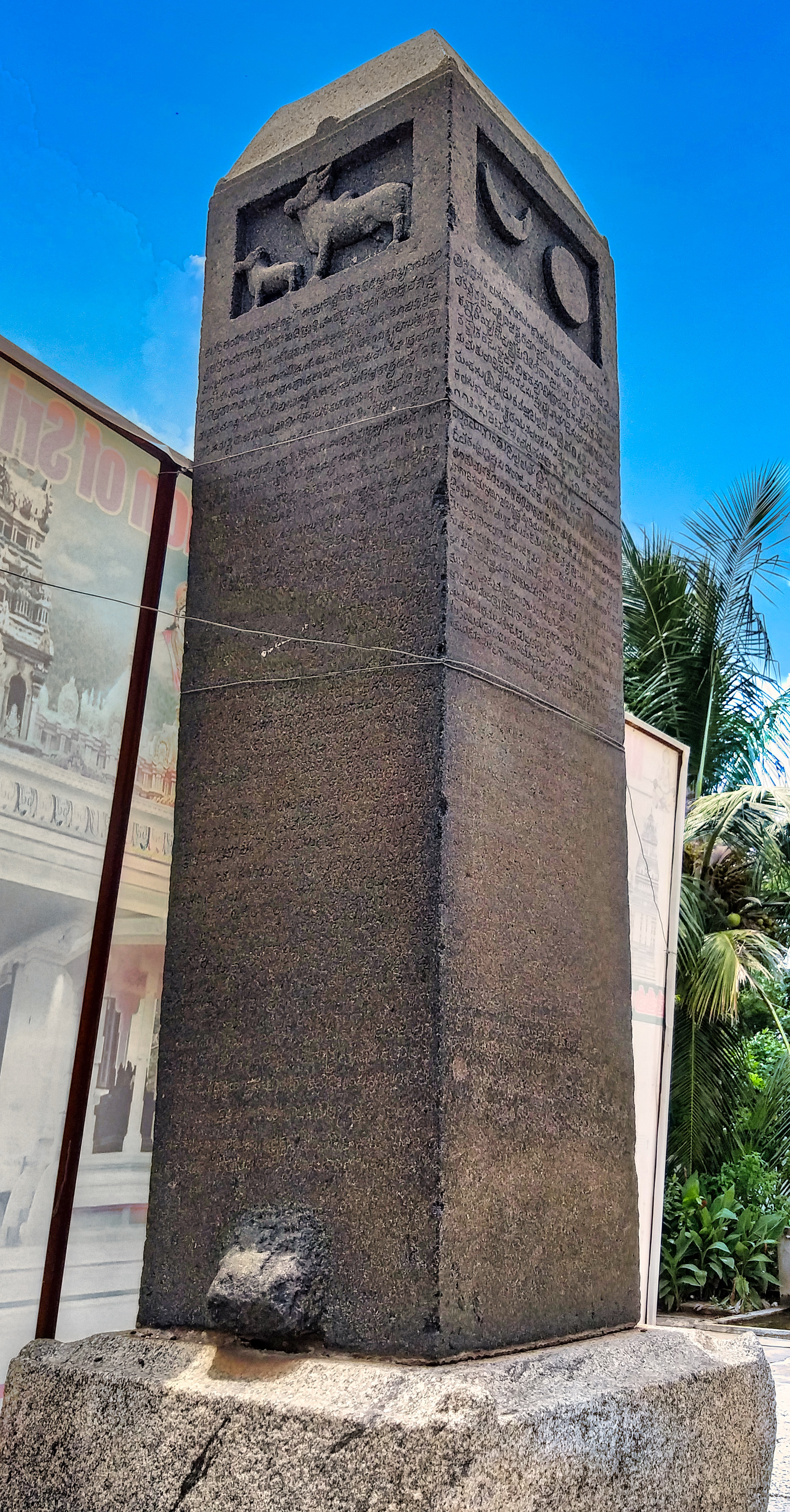
Inscription pillar

== Bibliography ==
1. Putcha, Vasudeva Parabrahma Sastry (1978). N. Ramesan (ed.). The Kākatiyas of Warangal. Hyderabad: Government of Andhra Pradesh. OCLC 252341228.
