= Nameswara Temple, Pillalamarri =

Hindu Temple in Suryapet district, Telangana

Nameswara Temple
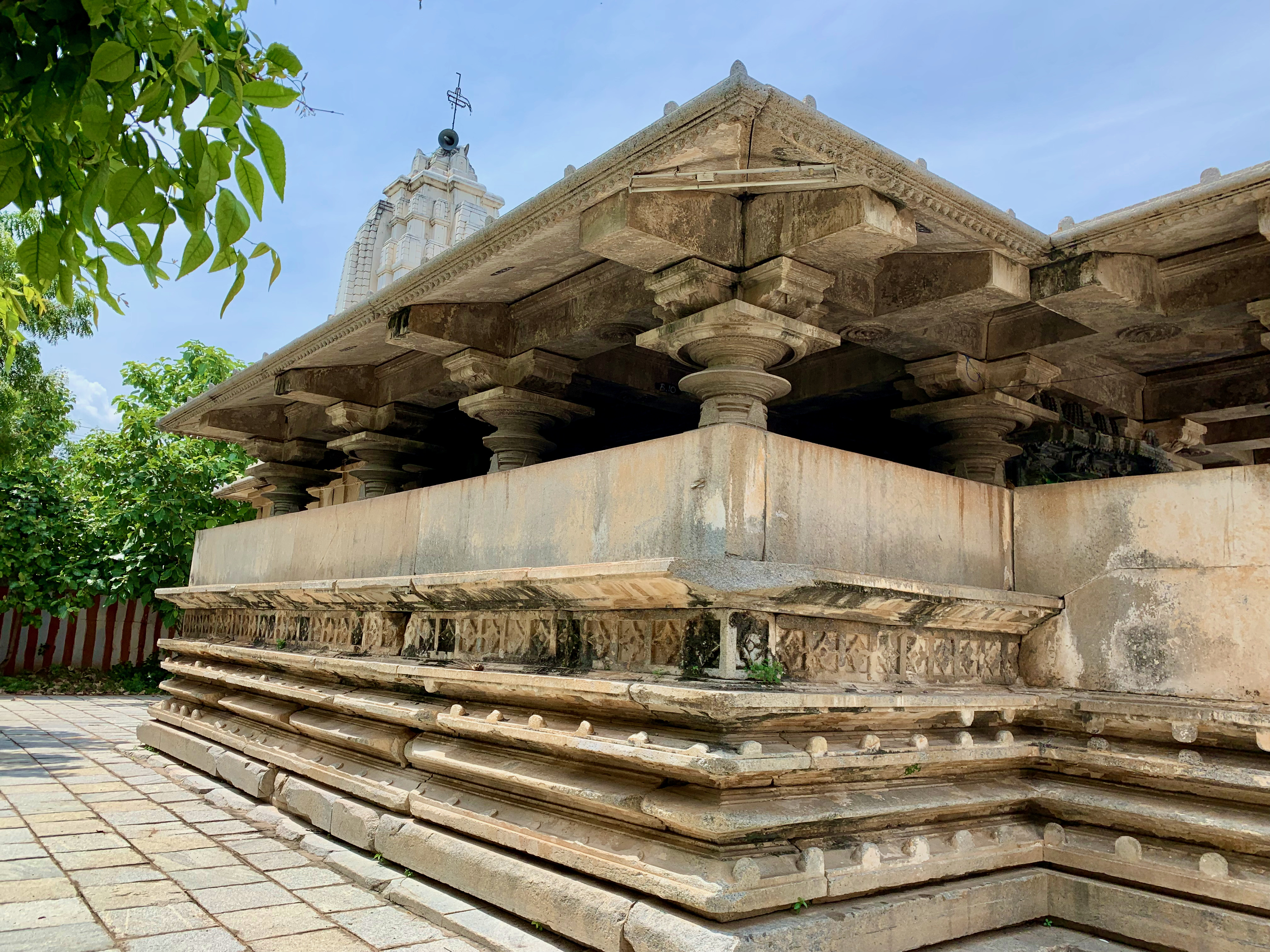
- Nameswara Temple

- Location in Telangana

Religion
- Affiliation: Hinduism
- District: Suryapet

Location
- Location: Pillalamarri, Suryapet
- State: Telangana
- Country: India
- Coordinates: 17.169157°N 79.584757°E

Architecture
- Type: Kakatiya architecture
- Completed: c. 1202 CE

Nameswara Temple, also known as Parvati Mahadeva Nameswara temple, is a Saivite Hindu temple located in Pillalamarri, Suryapet district of Telangana, India. It is a double temple, with the Trikuteswara Temple aligned in parallel to it on the immediate north. The Nameswara temple was constructed on the banks of the Musi river in c. 1202 CE by Namireddi of the Recherla Reddis family, who ruled this region and served as the feudatories of Kakatiyas. The genealogy of Namireddi, is given in the inscription on the pillar.

Nameswara Temple is one among the four prominent and intricately carved stone and granite temples located in Pillalamarri village, earlier a major city during the Kakatiya era in early 2nd-millennium. The other three being Erakeswara Temple (Shiva), Trikuteswara Temple (Shiva) and Chennakesava temple (Vishnu).

== Location ==
Pillalamarri is located at a distance of 6 km northwest of Suryapet town. Suryapet is located at a distance of 153 km from Hyderabad on the National Highway 65. The Trikuteswara temple – which means a temple for a lord of three shrines – is located within a square compound to the north of Nameswara temple.

== History ==
The temple was built in c. 1202 CE by Nami Reddy of the Recherla family who served as the feudatories of Kakatiyas.

The Genealogy of Recherla Nami Reddy mentioned as Namireddi:

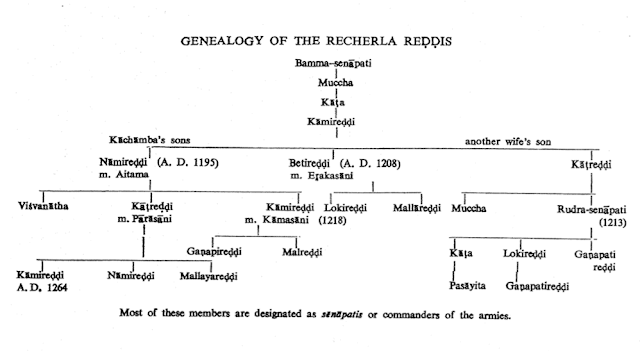
Family Tree of Recherla Reddy Chiefs

One of the earliest archaeological surveys and documentation of this temple was completed over 1926 and 1927 by Ghulam Yazdani – an archaeologist and epigraphist, and published in 1929. In this study, the four temples at Pillalamarri were in ruined state and incorrectly named as:

- Someswara Gudi (now identified as Erakeswara Temple or Yerakeswara)
- Narasimhadeva temple (now Nameswara temple)
- Mukandesvara temple (now Trikuteswara temple)
- Rameswara temple (now Chennakesava temple)

According to Yazdani, the Nameswara temple has several inscriptions. The earliest one is from 1195 CE, and that was when it was complete. A slab and the pillar in the temple compound with inscriptions on the four side was added in 1202 and 1208 CE respectively. The local ruler, patron and the builder of the temple was Namireddi, states Yazdani.

== Architecture ==
The temple consists of a portico which faces east and there is a hall behind it. This is followed by an antaralaya and garbhagudi (sanctum) in the western direction. The mandapa has space and pitha for a large Nandi, but it is missing (the nearby temple has a finely carved granite Nandi). The pillars in the Nameswara temple mandapa in front of its garbhagudi are intricately carved, but shows extensive signs of deliberate defacement and damage. The walls of the temple contain frescos. One of the paintings depicts Samudra mathanam with Devas and Asuras on the opposite sides holding the serpent Vasuki as a string wound round Mount Mandara which acts as the churning rod. The contemporary Vimana of the temple is modern in a style closer to Nagara architecture. According to photographs of this temple taken in 1926, the original Vimana had been lost and broken portions were on top of the sanctum.

== Gallery ==
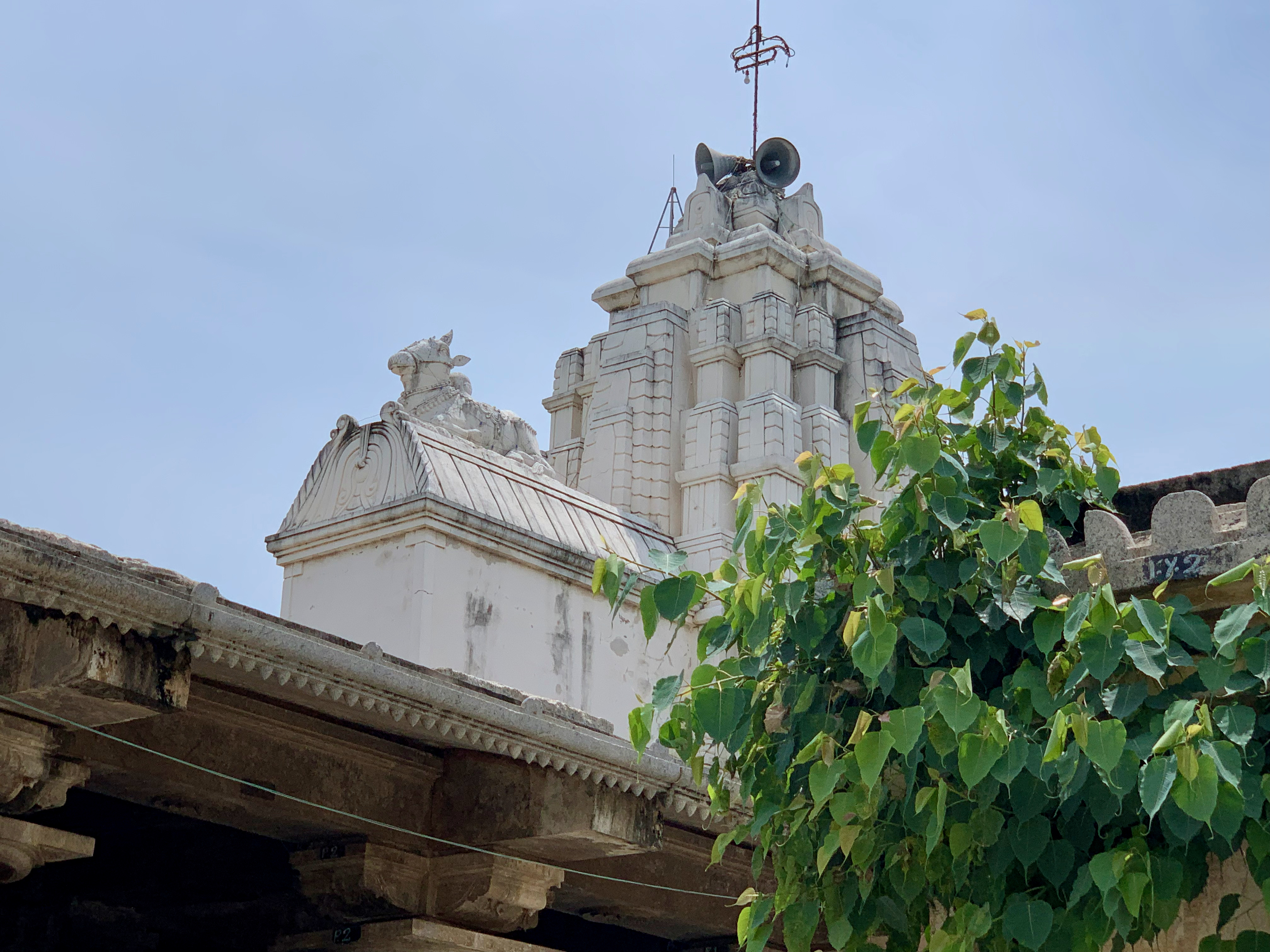
Nameshwara temple shikara

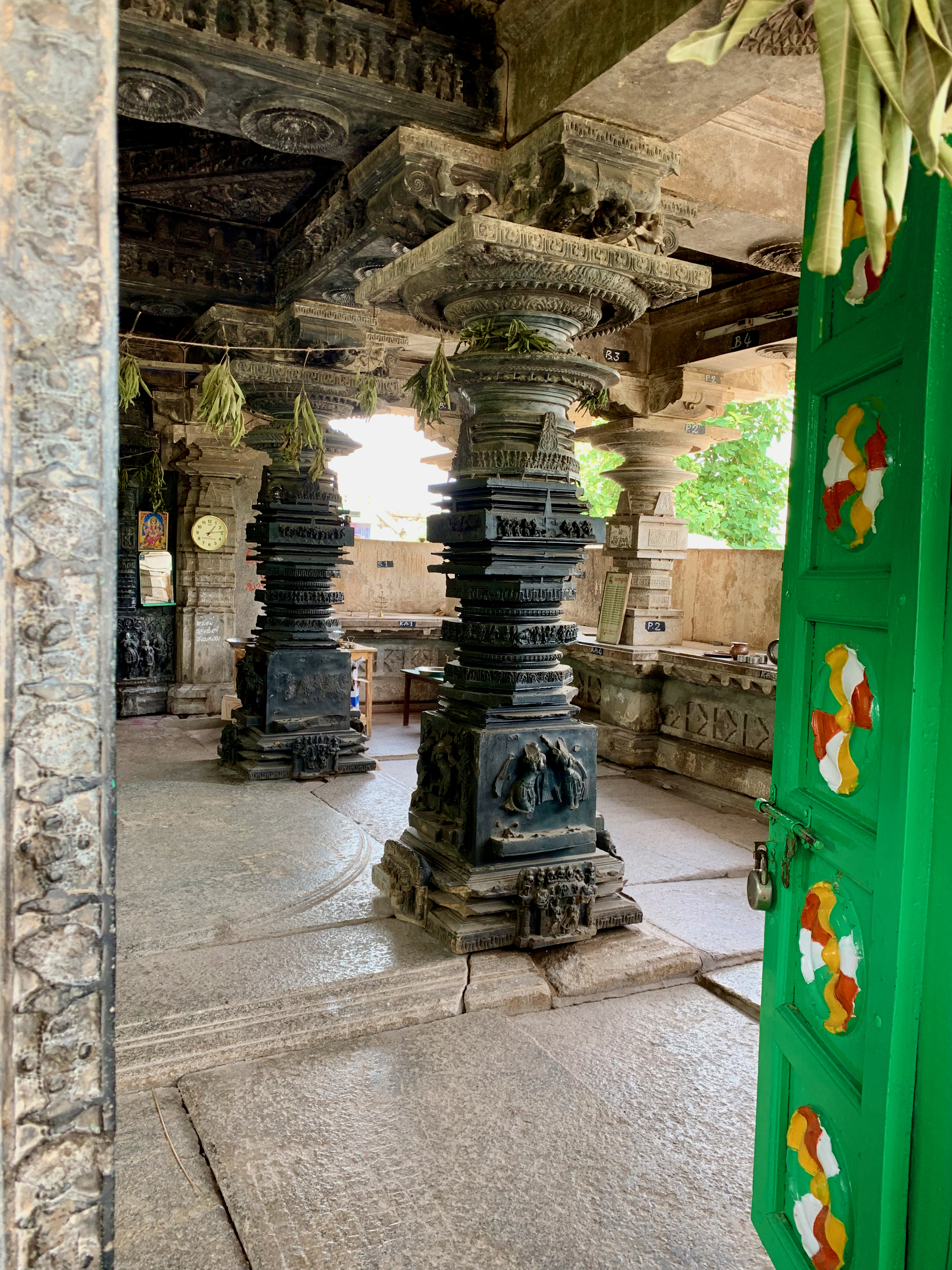
Mandapam

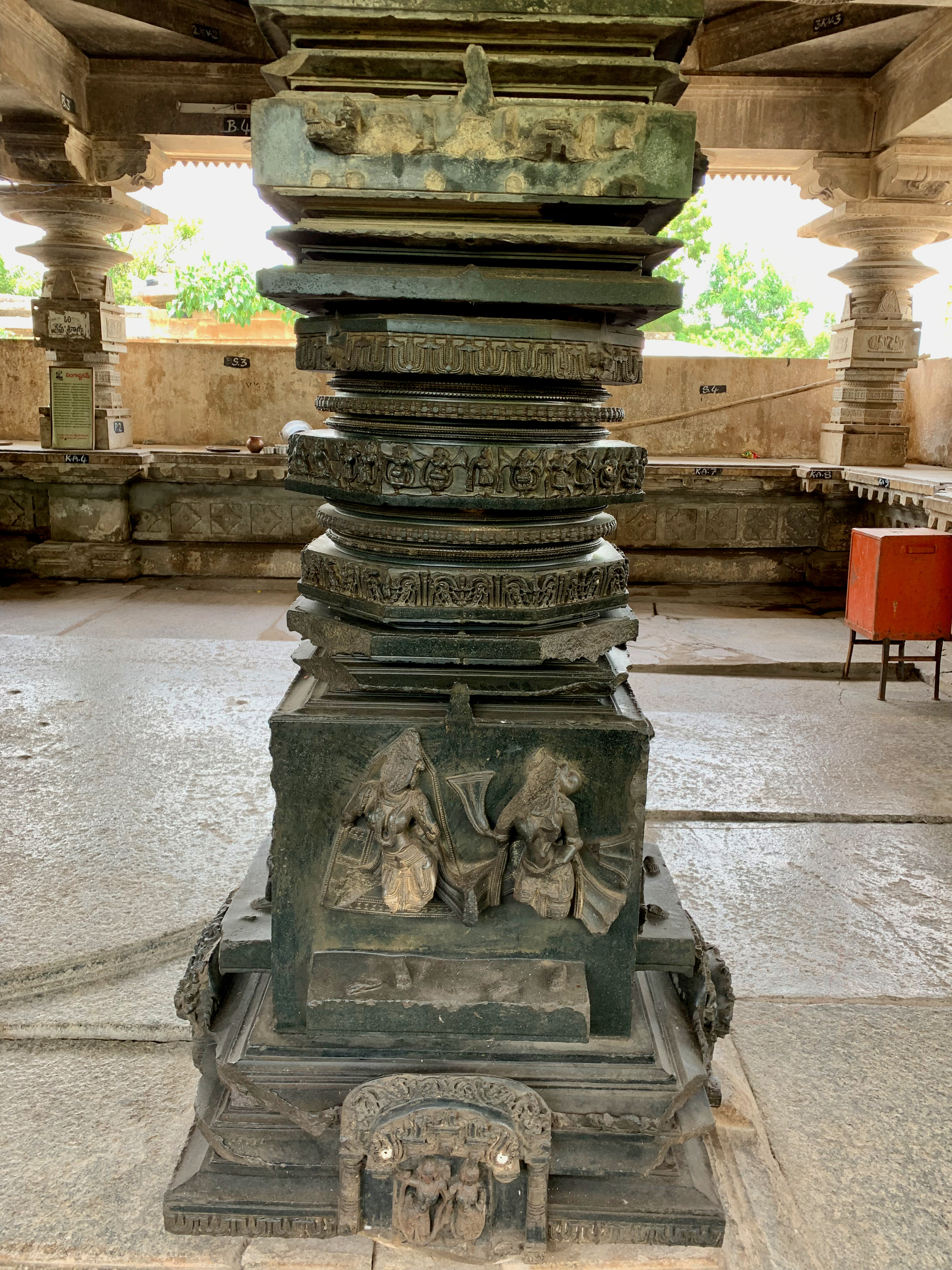
Pillar carvings (defaced), depict Hindu legends

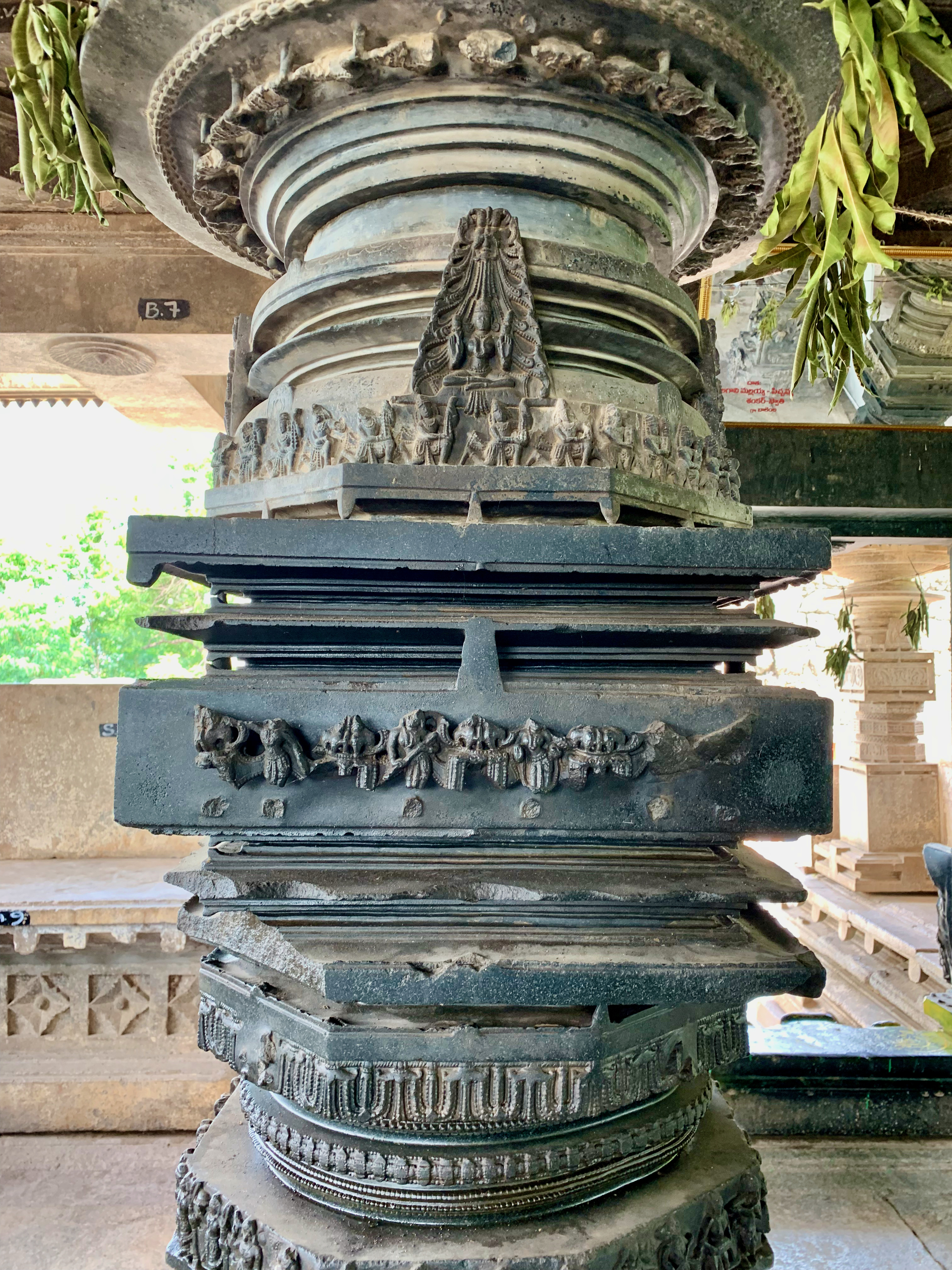
Pillar carvings (defaced)

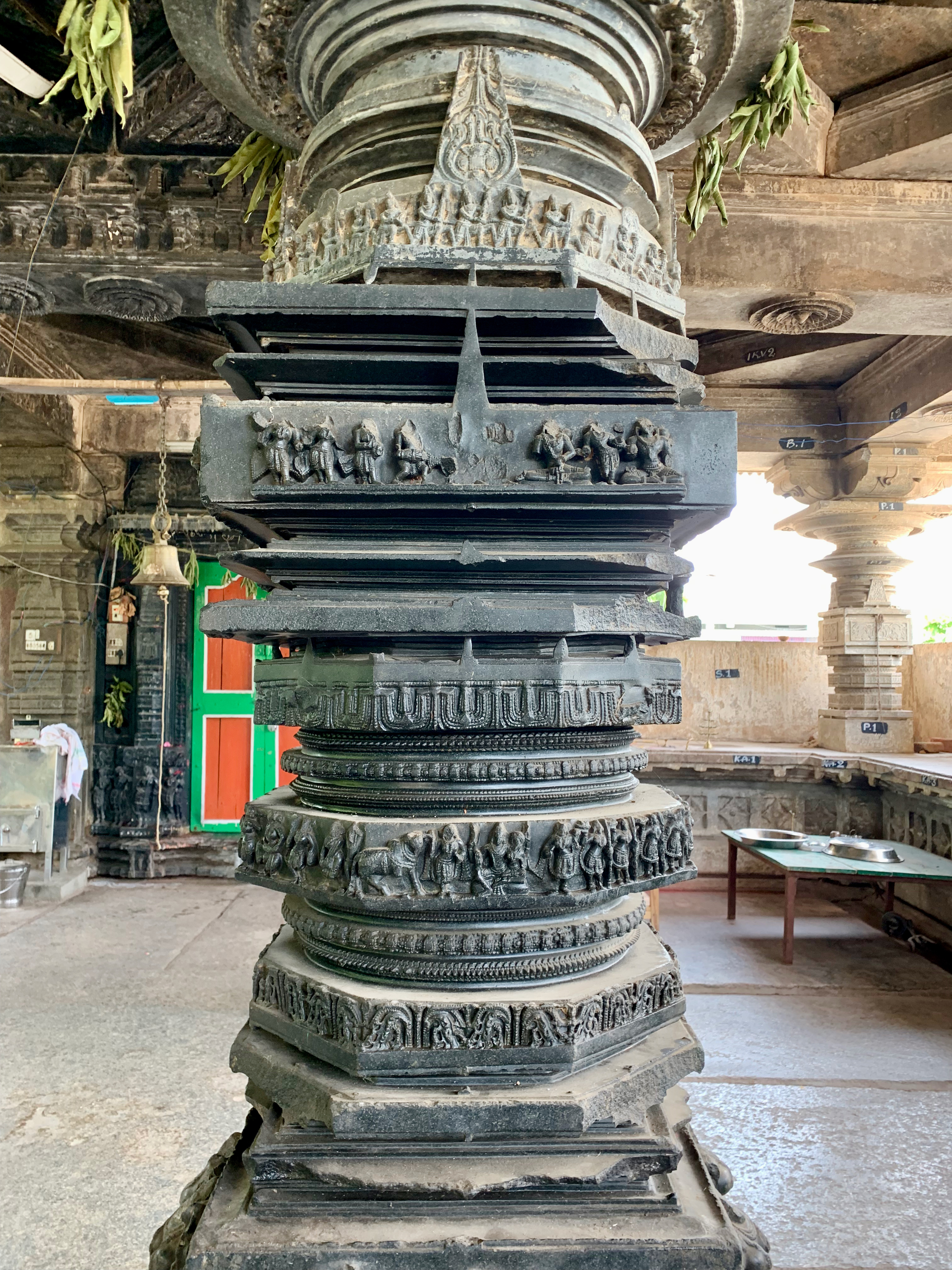
Pillar carvings (defaced)

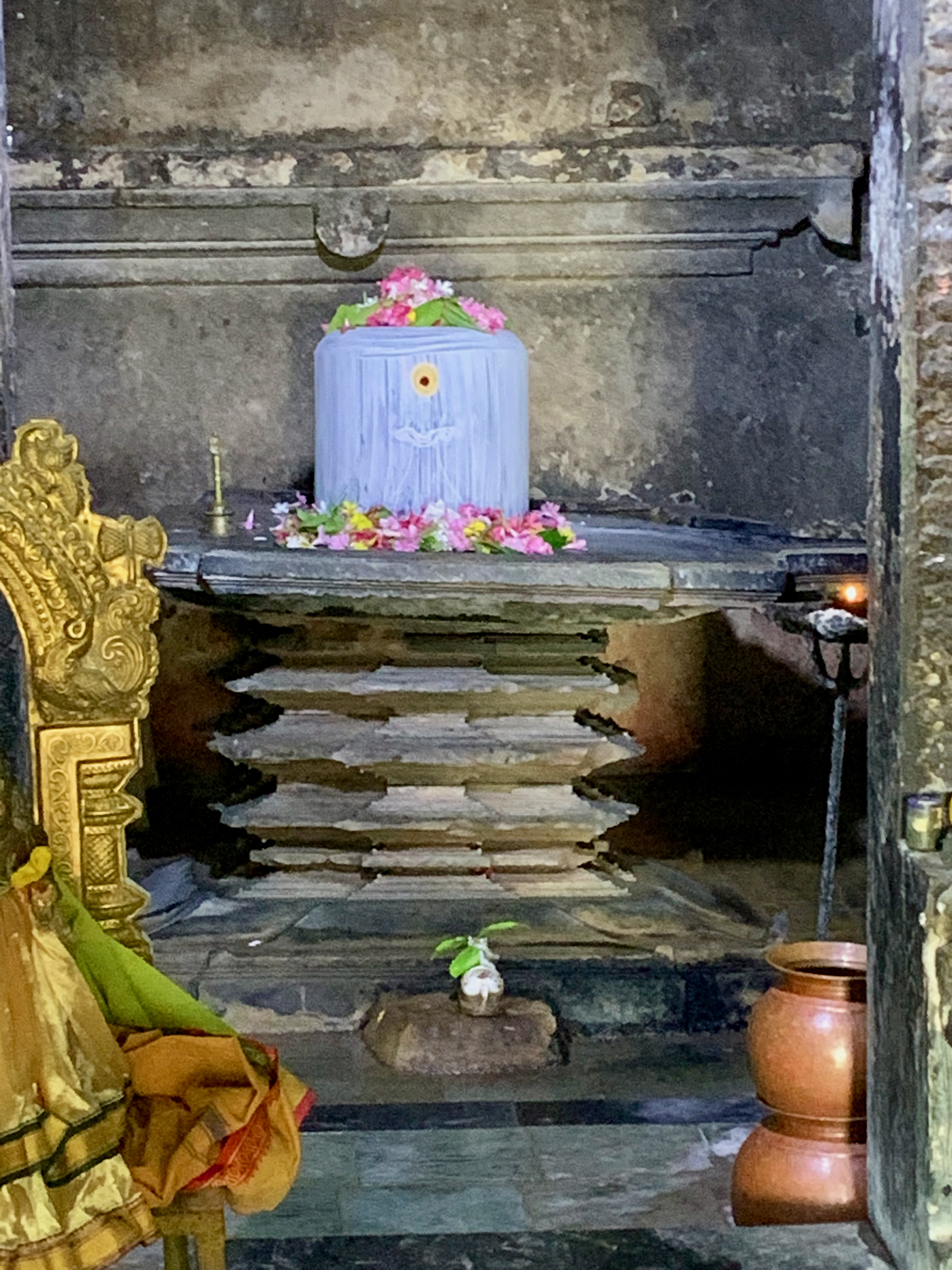
Shiva linga

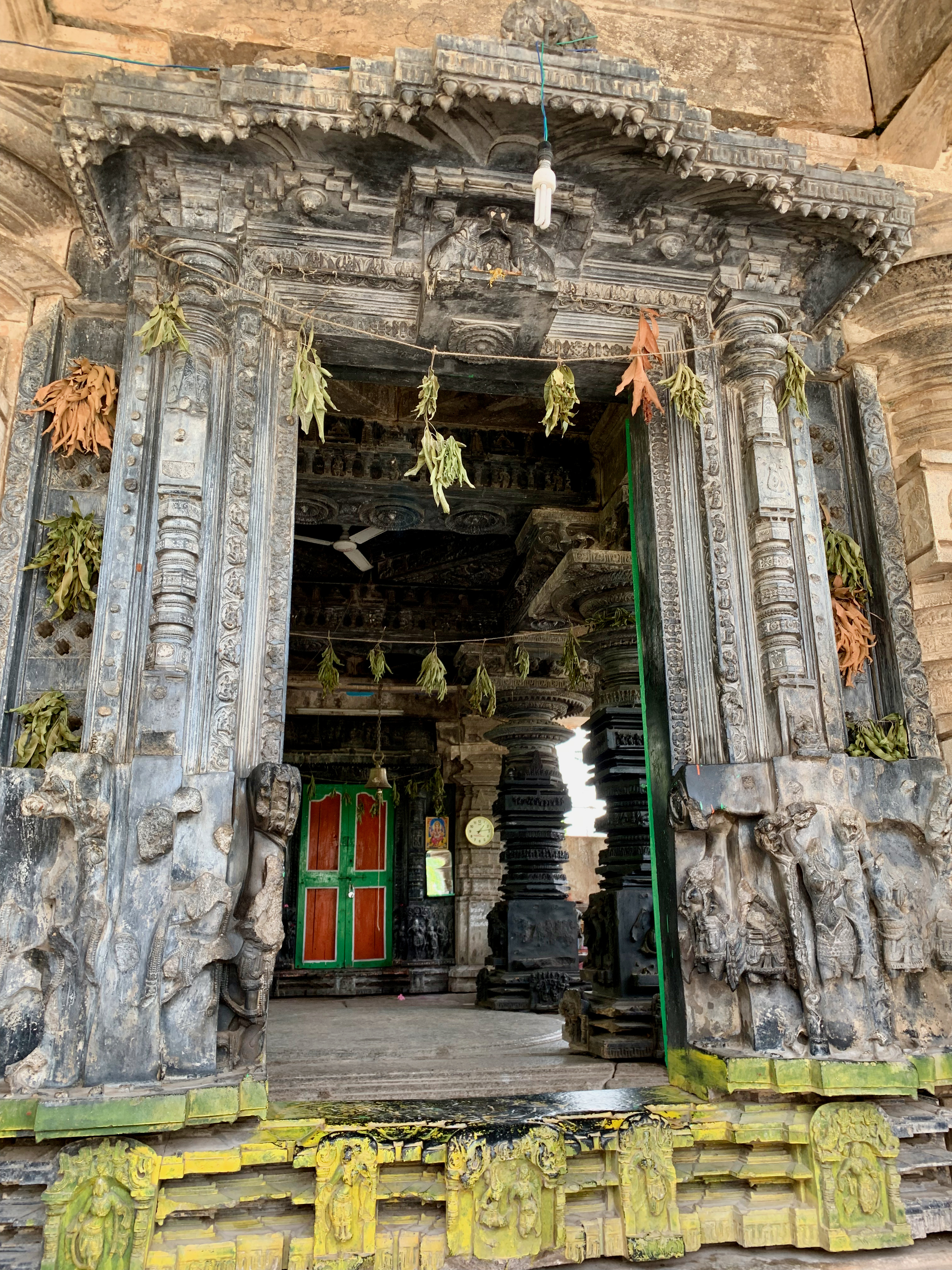
Mandapa entrance carvings

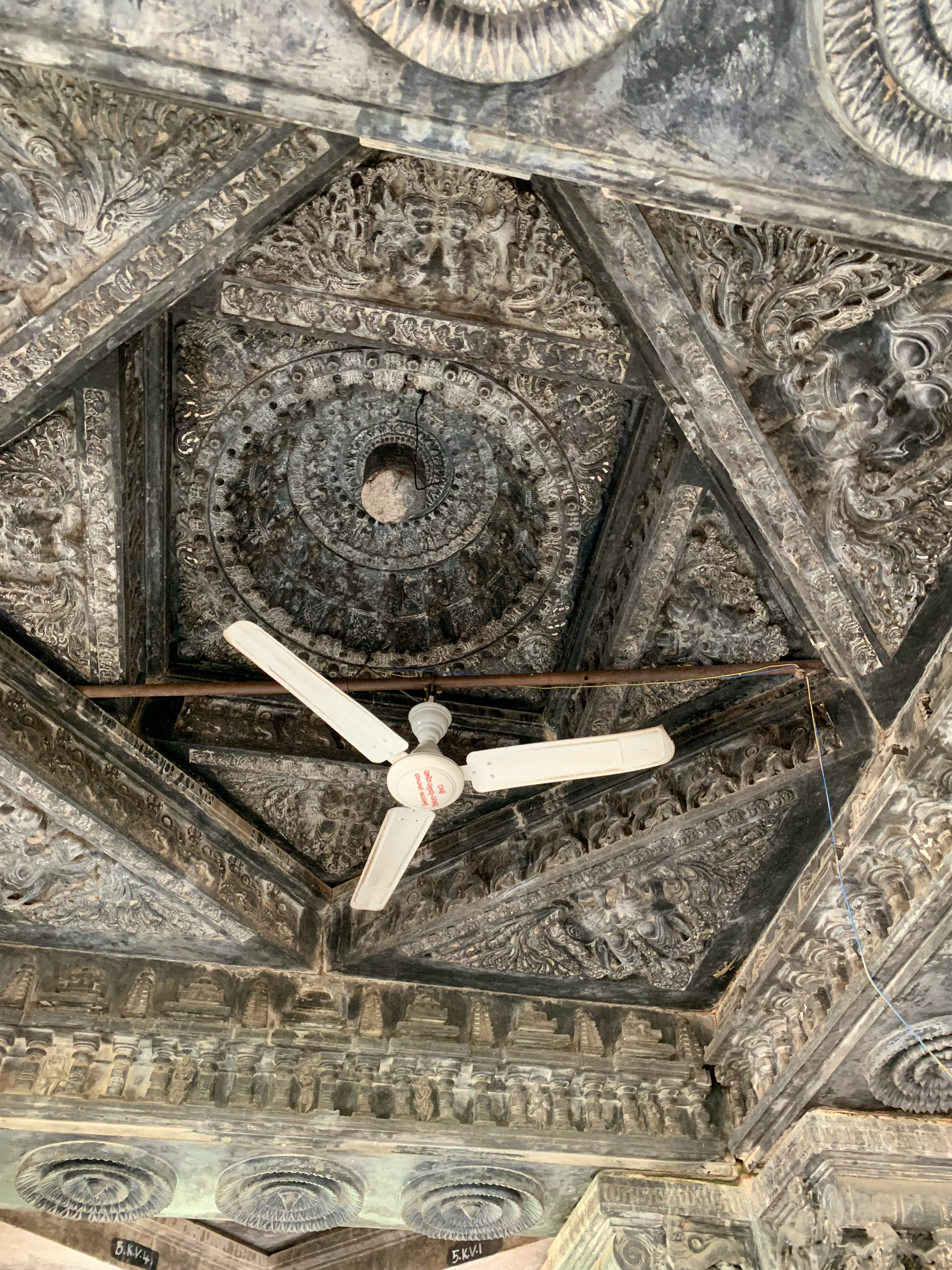
Ceiling artwork (contain diksha devas)

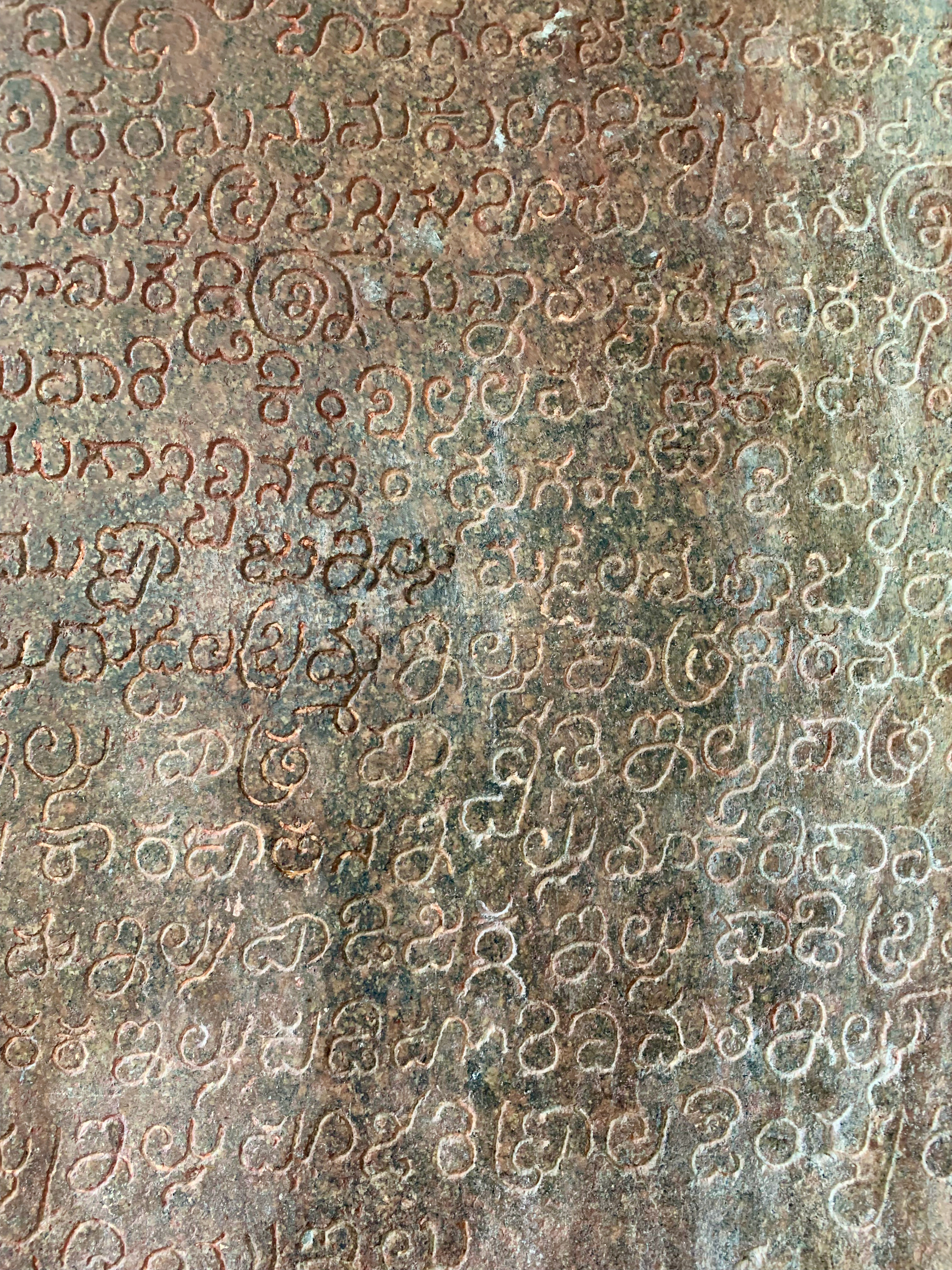
Inscription at the temple
