= List of Osmania University people =

This is a list of notable people related to the Osmania University. Excluded from this list are those people whose only connection with Osmania is that they were awarded an honorary degree.

== Arts ==
Name	Class Year	Degree	College	Notability	References
Ananda Shankar Jayant				classical dancer and a recipient of Padma Shri and Sangeet Natak Akademi Award	
Bholekar Srihari					
Diana Hayden				former Miss World and actress	
J. D. Chakravarthy	1986		CBIT	actor	
Kader Khan				actor and screenwriter	
Kandikonda					
Manasa Varanasi	2018	BE (CSE)	Vasavi	Miss India	
Nandamuri Balakrishna				Indian film actor, works in Telugu cinema	
Neeraj Ghaywan	2002	BE (EE)	CBIT	film director	
Nikhil Siddharth			MJCET	actor	
Santosh Kumar				Pakistani film actor	
Sekhar Kammula	1991		CBIT	film director	
Shyam Benegal				director and screenwriter, recipient of the Padma Bhushan in 1991	

== Business ==
Name	Class Year	Degree	College	Notability	References
Karan Bilimoria	1981	B.Com.		founder of Cobra Beer; Member of the House of Lords; seventh Chancellor of the University of Birmingham	
G. V. K. Reddy				GVK Group Chairman	
Sanjiv Sidhu				Chairman and CEO, i2 Technologies	
Shantanu Narayen				President and CEO, Adobe	
Divyesh Bine				Chairman and CEO, Sociobot	

== Humanities, social science, and literature ==
Name	Class Year	Degree	College	Notability	References
Bhadriraju Krishnamurti				Dravidianist and linguist, founded the Department of Linguistics at the university	
Bhoopal Reddy				Telugu writer	
Mahe Jabeen				social activist and writer; winner of Rajiv Gandhi Manavaseva award	
Makhdoom Mohiuddin				Urdu poet; Communist activist; recipient of the 1969 Sahitya Akademi Award in Urdu	
Masud Husain Khan				linguist; 5th Vice Chancellor of Jamia Millia Islamia	
Muhammad Hamidullah				scholar on Islamic law (earned his BA, LLB and MA at Osmania, and taught international law at the university between 1936 and 1946)	
Pilli Alfred James				Public Administrator	

== Law ==
Name	Class Year	Degree	College	Notability	References
B. Subhashan Reddy				Chief Justice of madras and Kerala High Court.	
B. Sudarshan Reddy	1971	LLB		Judge of the Supreme Court of India and 2025 vice presidential candidate	
Gopal Rao Ekbote					
Ghulam Mohammed					
M. S. Ramachandra Rao	1989				
N. Kumarayya				retired Chief Justice of Andhra Pradesh and ex-judge, World Bank Administrative Tribunal	
Sardar Ali Khan					
Syed Shah Mohammed Quadri		LLB		Judge of the Supreme Court of India	
Subodh Markandeya	1956; 1963			Indian Senior Advocate	
T. Amarnath Goud					
T. Meena Kumari					
Venkat Shrinivas Deshpande				Chief Justice of Bombay High Court.	

== Politicians and civil servants ==
Name	Class Year	Degree	College	Notability	References
Abid Hasan			University College of Law	former Indian Ambassador to Egypt	
Asaduddin Owaisi		BA	Nizam (Note: The Nizam College is affiliated to the Osmania University since 1947.)	Politician, Member of Parliament of Lok Sabha	
Ausaf Sayeed					
Ayesha Rubina	1991	BA, MA		Social Worker	
Bandaru Dattatreya				former Governor of Haryana and Himachal Pradesh	
Bhaskarrao Bapurao Khatgaonkar		BE	University College of Engineering	MP from Nanded	
C. Vidyasagar Rao		LLB		former Governor of Maharashtra	
Dharam Singh				17th Chief Minister of Karnataka	
Jaipal Reddy				Member of Parliament	
K. Chandrashekar Rao				1st Chief Minister of Telangana	
K. T. Rama Rao		B. Sc.	Nizam	Minister for Information Technology (IT), Municipal Administration and Urban Development (MAUD), Textiles and NRI Affairs, Telangana	
Kadiyam Srihari	1975	M.Sc		former Deputy Chief Minister of Telangana	
Keshavrao Sonawane					
Komatireddy Venkat Reddy			CBIT	Member of Parliament	
Kotla Jayasurya Prakasha Reddy				Member of Parliament	
Madhu Yaskhi				Member of Parliament; New York attorney	
Muralidhar Rao					
Nadendla Manohar		BA; MBA	Nizam College, University College of Commerce & Business Management	Former Andhra Pradesh Legislative Assembly Speaker, Former Member of Legislative Assembly, PAC Chairman - Jana Sena Party	
Nallari Kiran Kumar Reddy		B.Com.; LLB	Nizam, University College of Law	16th Chief Minister of Andhra Pradesh	
P. V. Narasimha Rao			University College of Arts	9th Prime Minister of India	
Revanth Reddy			Andhra Vidyalaya College	2nd Chief Minister of Telangana	
Shankarrao Chavan		LLB		5th Chief Minister of Maharashtra and former Minister of Finance	
Shivraj Patil			City College	former Minister for Home Affairs	
Suravaram Sudhakar Reddy				Politician, General Secretary of Communist Party of India	
Syed Akbaruddin	1980		Nizam		
V. Hanumantha Rao				Politician, Member of Parliament of Rajya Sabha	
Y. S. Chowdary	1984	BE (Mechanical Engineering)	CBIT	Politician, Member of Parliament of Rajya Sabha	
Y. S. Jagan Mohan Reddy		B.Com.	Nizam	17th Chief Minister of Andhra Pradesh	

== Science and Technology ==
Name	Class Year	Degree	College	Notability	References
Ali Nawaz Jung				engineer	
B. E. Vijayam				geologist	
D. Srinivasa Reddy				chemist	
Garikapati Narahari Sastry		BSc; MSc		chemist	
Manju Bansal				molecular biologist	
Muhammad Raziuddin Siddiqui				Pakistani theoretical physicist	
Hassan Nasiem Siddiquie				marine geologist, Padma Shri recipient and Shanti Swarup Bhatnagar laureate	
J. N. Reddy	1968			Distinguished and Regents' Professor, Texas A&M University	
Patcha Ramachandra Rao				metallurgist	
Rafi Ahmed	1968			virologist and immunologist	
Rakesh Sharma				cosmonaut, first Indian to travel in space	
Undurti Narasimha Das	1981	MD	Osmania Medical (Note: The Osmania Medical College was affiliated to the Osmania University between 1918 and 1986.)	immunologist, endocrinologist	

- Neelamraju Ganga Prasada Rao, plant breeder, popularly known as the Father of Hybrid Sorghum, Shanti Swarup Bhatnagar Prize recipient
- Vadapalli Chandrasekhar, organometallic chemist, Shanti Swarup Bhatnagar laureate
- G. Naresh Patwari, chemist and Shanti Swarup Bhatnagar laureate

== Sports ==
Name	Class Year	Degree	College	Notability	References
Arshad Ayub			City College	Cricketer	
Ashwini Ponnappa		B.Com.	St. Mary's	Badminton player	
Asif Iqbal				Cricketer	
Gagan Narang		BCA		Shooter	
Kenia Jayantilal				Cricketer	
Khlid Qayyum	1980	B.Com.	Nizam	Cricketer	
Harsha Bhogle		B.Tech. in Chemical Engineering		Cricket commentator	
Mohammed Azharuddin		B.Com.	Nizam	Cricketer	
Mumtaz Hussain				Cricketer	
Murtuza Baig				Cricketer	
Nikhat Zareen			A. V. College	Boxer	
Pullela Gopichand			A. V. College	Badminton player	
Samaresh Jung				Shooter	
Sania Mirza			St. Mary's	Tennis player	
Sultan Saleem				Cricketer	
Syed Abdul Rahim				Football coach	

== Others ==
- Mahzarin Banaji, psychologist and Richard Clarke Cabot Professor of Social Ethics at Harvard University
- Kancha Ilaiah, Dalit scholar
- K. Venkata Ramiah, founder Vice Chancellor of Kakatiya University; member of Union Public Service Commission
- G. Ram Reddy, father of Open Learning in India
- George Reddy, student leader
- Ramachandru Tejavath, Retired bureaucrat and Former Principal Secretary Industries Government of Odisha, and Special Representative of Government of Telangana
- Yaga Venugopal Reddy, former Governor of the Reserve Bank of India (PhD)
- Bhukhya Chandarakala Niru, Indian Administrative Service officer
- Omar Abedeen Qasmi Madani, Islamic scholar

== Notable faculty ==
Name	Affiliation	Notability	References
Chittoor Mohammed Habeebullah			
D. C. Reddy		Vice Chancellor 1999-2002	
Manazir Ahsan Gilani	Former Dean of Theology	Islamic scholar and author	
Masud Husain Khan	Head of the Department of Urdu between 1962 and 1968	Urdu linguist	
Pingle Jaganmohan Reddy		former Chief Justice of the Hyderabad High Court	
Sardar Ali Khan	Dean of the Faculty of Law between 1984 and 1991	acting Chief Justice of the Hyderabad High Court	
Suri Bhagavantam	Head of the Physics Department between 1949 and 1952; Vice Chancellor between 1952 and 1957	scientist and science administrator	
Zubaida Yazdani	Served at various positions in the Women's College and University College of Arts	historian	
