= Pothuraju Judson =

Indian entomologist (born 1950)

Professor P. Judson Ph.D. (Osmania)
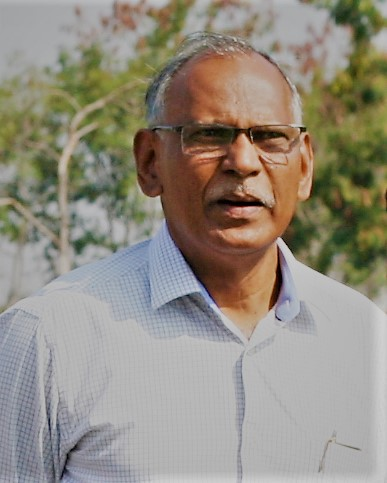
- Professor Judson in early 2019
- Born: 28 July 1950 (age 76); Hyderabad State (1948–1956)
- Citizenship: Indian
- Education: B. Sc., M. Sc., Ph. D.
- Alma mater: Osmania University, Secunderabad
- Known for: Research in Entomology
- Scientific career
- Fields: Entomology
- Workplaces: University College of Science, Saifabad, Department of Zoology, Osmania University, Secunderabad
- Thesis: The effect of exogenous juvenile hormone on the reproductive system of bug Dysdercus similes Freeman (1980)

P. Judson is an Indian entomologist, who researched much on Dysdercus cingulatus in the 1970s. In the successive decades, he took to teaching of Zoology at Osmania University, Secunderabad, a State-run University u/s 2 (f) of the University Grants Commission Act, 1956. He contributed much to the discipline of Entomology through scholarly articles in scientific journals (see section on writings). He was also a member of the Indian Society for Comparative Animal Physiology.

Judson was Lecturer, Reader, then Professor and Head and Chairperson of Board of Studies of Department of Zoology at Osmania University, Secunderabad. Earlier in 1997, he became Principal of the University College of Science, Saifabad. During his tenure, a full-fledged vocational course in Dryland farming leading to B. Sc. (Dryland farming) was launched in 2001 with the cooperation of three external stakeholders, namely, International Crops Research Institute for the Semi-Arid Tropics (ICRISAT), Central Research Institute for Dryland Agriculture (CRIDA) and Acharya N. G. Ranga Agricultural University (ANGRAU).

Much like an Old Testament Scholar contributing to the German academic journal Zeitschrift für die Alttestamentliche Wissenschaft (ZAW), Judson and others, contributed a research article in 1978 to the Leipzig-based academic journal, Zeitschrift für mikroskopisch-anatomische Forschung.

== Few co-authored Writings ==
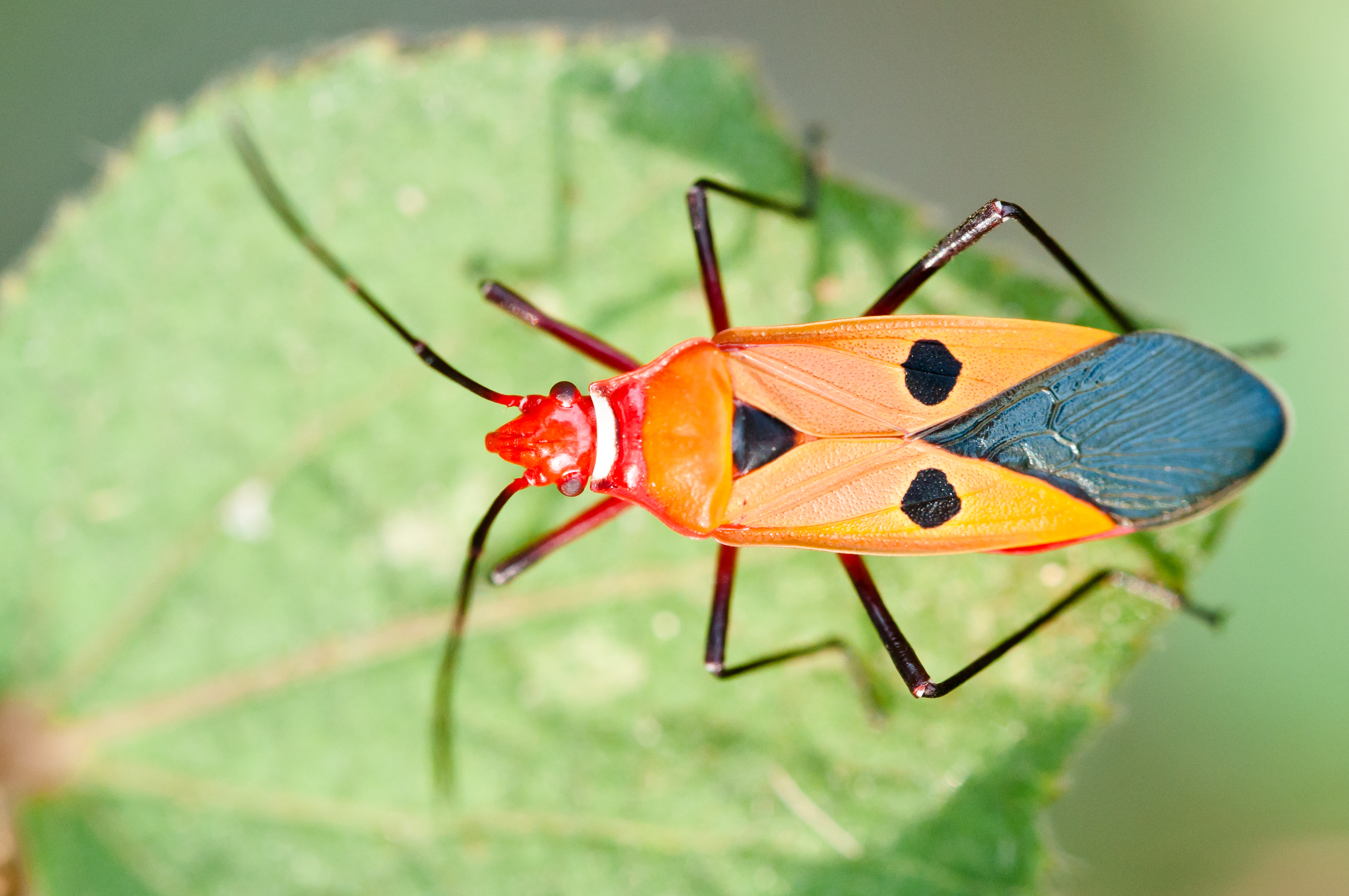
Dysdercus cingulatus of Pyrrhocoridae family on which Judson researched much in the 1970s.

Judson's articles co-authored with others appeared in major scientific journals. One of Judson's research articles published in 1978 with B. Kishen Rao, S. S. Thakur and B. Juilus Divakar entitled The effects of a juvenile hormone analogue on the male reproductive organs of the red cotton bug, Dysdercus cingulatus (Heteroptera) appeared in the scientific journal Experientia (now Cellular and Molecular Life Sciences),

He was much active among the academic fraternity in Hyderabad, India. In 2007, he co-organized a National Conference on Biodiversity Conversation and Human Wellbeing, which was conducted jointly by the Department of Zoology (OU) and Sálim Ali Centre for Ornithology and Natural History. In 2008, he co-edited a compendium titled Biodiversity Conservation and Human Well-Being. In 2009, Judson convened a national symposium on the theme Implications of climate change on mosquito-borne diseases and its impact on public health at Sir Ronald Ross Institute of Parasitology.

His co-authored writings comprise,

- Judson P, Julius Divakar B, Kishen Rao B (December 1976). "The effect of "Paper factor" on the fecundity and hatchability in Dysdercus cingulatus (Heteroptera: Pyrrhocoridae)". Current Science. 45 (24): 867–868. ISSN 0011-3891. JSTOR 24081409.
- Judson P, Julius Divakar B, Kishen Rao B (December 1977). "Transfer of Juvenoids and Inhibition of Embryogenesis in Dysdercus cingulatus (Heteroptera)". Current Science. 46 (2): 44. ISSN 0011-3891. JSTOR 24080234.
- Judson P, Kishen Rao B, Thakur SS, Julius Divakar B (1978). "Histological changes in the ovaries of Dysdercus cingulatus (F.) caused by the "paper factor"". Zeitschrift für mikroskopisch-anatomische Forschung. 92 (3): 541–546. ISSN 0044-3107. PMID 751342.
- Maruthi Ram G, Kishen Rao B, Thakur SS, Judson P (1978). "Juvenile hormone-like activity of the Pygidial secretion of Anthia sexguttata (F.) (Carabidae: Coleoptera)". Journal of Animal Morphology and Physiology. 25: 93–100. ISSN 0021-8804.
- Judson P, Kishen Rao B, Thakur SS, Julius Divakar B (1978). "The effects of a Juvenile hormone analogue on the male reproductive organs of the red cotton bug, Dysdercus cingulatus (Heteroptera)". Experientia. 34 (6): 817–818. doi:10.1007/BF01947347. ISSN 1420-9071. S2CID 10799244.
- Ashok S, Kishen Rao B, Thakur SS, Judson P, Samuel Raj N, Maruthi Ram G (1978). "Defensive secretion of the soap-nut bug Tessaratoma javanica (Thunberg) (Heteroptera, Pentatomidae) as a juvenile hormone mimic". Zoologische Jahrbücher. Abteilung für allgemeine Zoologie und Physiologie der Tiere. 82 (4): 383–394. ISSN 0044-5185.
- Judson P, Kishen Rao B, Thakur SS, Revathy D (1979). "Effect of Precocene II on Reproduction of the Bug Dysdercus similis (F.) (Heteroptera)". Indian Journal of Experimental Biology. 17 (2): 947. ISSN 0975-1009.
- Judson P, Rao VS (1989). "Biology of the Dysdercus koenigii in relation with the mortality and sex ratio (Pyrrhocoridae: Heteroptera)". Pestology. 13 (11): 8–11. ISSN 0970-3012.

== Other initiatives ==
Judson is a communicant member of Samavesam of Telugu Baptist Churches (STBC) and attached to the STBC-Baptist Church, Lallaguda, Secunderabad. He is also associated with Training in Evangelism Needs and Technology (TENT), a brain child of the Geologist, B. E. Vijayam, who set up such facility to promote means of livelihood with the inspiration being attributed to Bishop Bunyan Joseph of the Church of South India, a rural Evangelist, Canon (priest) and later Bishop.

=== Inter-faith dialogue ===
Judson was also involved in other initiatives relating to Interfaith dialogue and Community development. He was on the Council of the Henry Martyn Institute, Shivarampally for over a decade. Judson was on the Committee and later on the Council, which was led by Theologians comprising C. L. Furtado, P. Surya Prakash and others. Judson came up on the Committee, especially at a crucial juncture, when the institute relocated to its new campus in Shivarampally from its earlier locality in Abids.

=== Community development ===
Judson is also on the Advisory Board of Genesis Urban and Rural Development under whose aegis a National Conference on emerging challenges and opportunities in Agriculture, Social, Plant, Environment, Cooperatives and Technology was held in 2016.

Efforts by the members of the STBC-Baptist Church, Lallaguda resulted in creation of a social action initiative which was named Burden and Love for Economically and Socially Suppressed (BLESS) in which Judson has been active and presently holds the position of Secretary. Through the Church, he has been actively involved in promoting food security among those marginalized dry land farmers of Telangana through System of Rice Intensification in a few mandals of Yadadri Bhuvanagiri district and Medchal-Malkajgiri district.

During the 2010s, he took up social action initiatives in Andhra Pradesh, Telangana and Odisha through the Canadian Baptist Ministries in which he was a Field Staff and Team member. Judson is the present India representative of European Baptist Mission International overseeing social action programmes together with 16 partners in the country.

== See also ==
- Prof. Dr. M. Abel, Ph. D. (California),
- Prof. Dr. T. D. J. Nagabhushanam, Ph. D. (IARI),
- Prof. Dr. P. A. James, Ph. D. (Osmania)
- Dr. J. A. Oliver, Ph. D. (ANGRAU),
- Prof. Dr. B. E. Vijayam, Ph. D. (Osmania),

Academic offices
Preceded by M. Janardhan Reddy, 1995-1997	Principal, University College of Science, Saifabad; 1997-2001	Succeeded by M. Prabhakar, 2001-2003
Honorary titles
Preceded by P. Joshua	Chairperson, Council of Christian Hospitals, Pithapuram, Andhra Pradesh; 2019-	Succeeded by Incumbent
