= Jetti =

Jetti is an Indian surname belonging to Gowda community (lit. the most excellent wrestlers) and Agriculturist in Karnataka. Jetty caste is predominantly seen in Karnataka(Mainly in Mysuru, Bengaluru, Chamarajnagar, Chikkabalapur, Shimogga & Kamma in Telugu States.

- As wrestling and Agricultural were the main professionals it belonged to Vokkaliga Gowda Jetty community since a long time
- Jetti Geeta Reddy or J. Geeta Reddy is an Indian politician of Congress party
- Jetti Veera Raghavulu or J. V. Raghavulu is an Indian playback singer and music director
- Jetti A. Oliver, an Indian Agriculturalist

== See also ==
Jetty (disambiguation)
