= Jetti A. Oliver =

Indian agriculturist

Dr. Jetti Alfred Oliver Ph. D. (ANGRAU)
- Born: Khammam, Telangana, India
- Other name: J. A. Oliver
- Citizenship: India
- Education: Ph. D. in development economics
- Alma mater: Acharya N. G. Ranga Agricultural University, Bapatla
- Known for: fostering ecumenism
- Scientific career
- Fields: Microeconomics; Rural Development

Jetti Alfred Oliver (J. A. Oliver) is the present chancellor of Sam Higginbottom University of Agriculture, Technology & Sciences (SHUATS), Allahabad , which is a Govt. Aided Private (Minority) University under section 2 (f) of the University Grants Commission Act, 1956. He is an agriculturalist, with his past experience in the development sector, continues to be in the forefront of the leadership of like-minded initiatives and is an elected member of the 10-member international governing council of the Society for International Development (SID).

== Education ==
Oliver was born in Raigudem village of Khammam district in Telangana, India. He obtained his doctorate in development economics from Acharya N.G. Ranga Agricultural University in 1970.

== Initiatives ==
=== Rural development ===
In 1974, Oliver headed the Rural Agricultural and Gramodyog Development Society in Khammam, which was involved in improving quality of life among the rural folk. During the next decade, Oliver moved over to Hyderabad and was leading the Centre for Promoters of Rural Development (CPRD) and was also associated with the Andhra Pradesh Voluntary Health Association.

=== Historical studies ===
As an academic, Oliver has been a member of the fully ecumenical, Church History Association of India (CHAI), Bangalore, where he has been providing the required support for conduction of the regional meetings of the CHAI since the 1980s, espousing the cause of scholarly spirit among the Church historians in the study of History of Christianity and the emergence of the Church as an academic discipline.

=== Telugu literature ===
Oliver has been espousing the cause of Telugu literature, as chairperson of the Telugu Theological Literature Board (TTLB), which has been in the forefront of publishing the Telugu Bible Dictionary since many decades. Also, as state representative of the National Council of Churches in India (NCCI), he is involved in overseeing the translation of a Daily Bible Reading book published by the International Bible Reading Association from English into Telugu by taking the assistance of Theologians who include the Systematic Theologian B. J. Christie Kumar, STBC, the Christian educator, Johanna Rose Ratnavathi, AELC among others, which helps in Bible reading among the faithful by providing the devotional in Telugu language .

As a promoter of the Telugu Bible, Oliver has also been in the leadership of the Bible Society of India Andhra Pradesh Auxiliary from the time when the Auxiliary was led by The Rev. Lella Prakasam, CBCNC and after its bifurcation in 2016, he continues to be associated with the Bible Society of India Telangana Auxiliary headquartered in Secunderabad.

=== Inter-faith dialogue ===
Since the beginning of the 1980s, Oliver had been in the forefront of Interfaith dialogue and promotion of communal amity. In 1986, Oliver spoke on the Role of Church in peace making conducted by the Henry Martyn Institute for Islamic Studies, Hyderabad during the tenure of its Director Sam V. Bhajjan, which was well attended by Religious scholars of diverse faiths from the notable Universities in the country. When the 1990 Hyderabad riots occurred during the tenure of then Chief Minister, Marri Chenna Reddy, Oliver as a Citizen of Hyderabad interacted with the religious heads of different faith traditions and led a peace march around Clock Tower, Secunderabad together with a Pujari, Imam, Jathedar, Bhikkhu, Jain monk, and a Catholic Priest, all of whom held hands and walked side by side as a show of togetherness in the presence of the Hyderabadi Historian Vasant K. Bawa.

=== Ecumenism and the unity of the Churches ===
In fostering ecumenism and unity among the Churches, Oliver has made his contribution through the regional Councils of Churches which are affiliated to the National Council of Churches in India, Nagpur and was also its vice-president in the 1990s and had made immense contribution to the revision of the Constitution of the NCCI.

Oliver was honorary secretary of the Andhra Pradesh and Telangana Council of Churches and used to maintain brotherly relations with the Catholic, Orthodox, Protestant and the New and Indigenous Churches and liaised with Archbishops S. Arulappa followed by M. Joji. Keeping doctrinal differences aside, during the tenure of Oliver, many small and indigenous Churches were welcomed into the fold of the Council of Churches, including the Good Samaritan Evangelical Lutheran Church, and Oliver also participated in a central committee meeting of the World Council of Churches in 1992.

=== Theological education ===
The Protestant Regional Theologiate in Secunderabad is affiliated to India's first University, the Senate of Serampore College (University) {a University under Section 2 (f) of the University Grants Commission Act, 1956}with degree-granting authority validated by a Danish Charter and ratified by the Government of West Bengal. Oliver represented the Andhra Pradesh and Telangana Council of Churches in the board of governors of the near-ecumenical Protestant Regional Theologiate, the Andhra Christian Theological College, Secunderabad comprising some of the Protestant Church Societies – the Methodists, Lutherans, Baptists, and the Anglicans, Congregationalists and the Wesleyan Methodists from the time when the Theologiate was led by The Rev. S. Joseph, STBC followed by The Rev. M. Victor Paul, AELC, The Rev. R. Yesurathnam, CSI and the successive Principalships.

== Writings ==
- 1992 (with T. D. J. Nagabhushanam)- Sustainable Agriculture, its problems and prospects,
- 2000 - Recolonisation, Globalisation and the Role of the Church. - this writing was also referred to by the Social ethics Scholar, I. John Mohan Razu.

== See also ==
- Prof. Dr. M. Abel, Ph. D. (California),
- Prof. Dr. T. D. J. Nagabhushanam, Ph. D. (IARI),
- Prof. Dr. P. A. James, Ph. D. (Osmania),
- Prof. Dr. B. E. Vijayam, Ph. D. (Osmania)
- Prof. Dr. P. Judson, Ph. D. (Osmania)
