= B. E. Vijayam =

Indian geologist (1933–2019)

professor B. E. Vijayam PhD (Osmania)
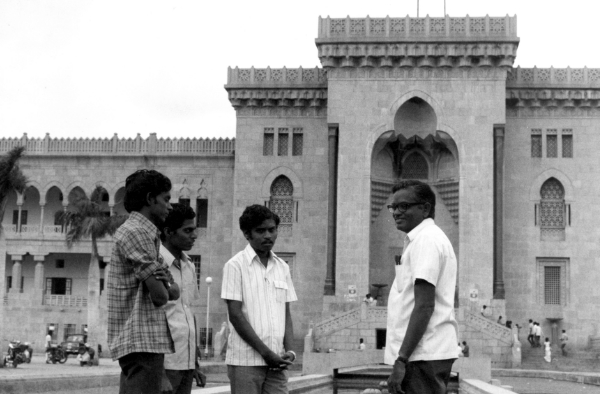
- Professor Vijayam with his students at Osmania University, Secunderabad (1973) (Courtesy Mennonite Church USA archives)
- Born: 20 November 1933; Giddalur under Madras Presidency (present day Andhra Pradesh)
- Died: 30 January 2019 (aged 85); Secunderabad, Telangana, India
- Resting place: 17°28′26.1″N 78°42′05.5″E
- Other names: Bunyan Edmund Vijayam
- Citizenship: Indian
- Education: BSc (Andhra), MSc (Andhra), PhD (Osmania), Postdoctoral researcher (Northwestern)
- Alma mater: Madras Christian College, Tambaram (Tamil Nadu), Andhra University, Waltair (Andhra Pradesh), Osmania University, Secunderabad (Telangana), Northwestern University, Evanston (United States)
- Known for: Teaching and research in applied Geology
- Awards: Prof. Bal Dattatreya Tilak Endowment Lecture (1995), Indian National Science Academy, New Delhi
- Scientific career
- Fields: Sedimentology
- Institutions: Geological Society of India, Osmania University,
- Patrons: Fulbright Program
- Thesis: Sedimentation in the upper proterozoic near Kurnool
- Doctoral advisor: Prof. S. Balakrishna
- Other academic advisors: Prof. C. Mahadevan, Prof. U. Aswathanarayana
- Website: http://bevijayam.com/

Bunyan Edmund Vijayam (1933–2019) was an Indian geologist with major contribution to the field of Geology. A 1958–1959 Technical Report of the Council of Scientific and Industrial Research heralded the news that new developments had taken place in scientific matters led by a team of researchers at the Andhra University,

A new technique for the ion-exchange separation of uranium from thorium and rare earths has been developed. A simple chromatographic method for the estimation of thorium (present in very small quantities) has been evolved. This uses thenoyl trifluoroacetone (TTA) in benzene as solvent-C. Mahadevan, U. Aswathanarayana, V. V. S. S. Tilak, B. E. Vijayam and D. Purushottam, Department of Geology, Andhra University.....

Even as a student of geology at Andhra University, Waltair, Vijayam and his fellow researchers were already carrying out research in the field. During 1954–1958, Vijayam had carried out research on geology in parts of Kurnool district. Vijayam's research articles began appearing in geological and other inter-disciplinary scientific journals for more than three decades and continue to be referred by the present generation of Geologists.

Vijayam stood witness to Christ and inspired many. During the Fifth National Convention of the Christian Businessmen's Committee in 1987 held in Hyderabad, he spoke on the theme You shall be witnesses unto me and shared dais with Archbishop Samineni Arulappa, Member of parliament, Lok Sabha Marjorie Godfrey and Policeman G. Alfred, IPS. Vijayam also led honorary initiatives towards Christian missions by equipping the Laity not only with knowledge of the Gospel, but also a means of livelihood was recognised by Theologians, comprising the Missiologist, Roger Hedlund, SB, and Bishop Ezra Sargunam, ECI. During the 2000s, the Christian artist P. Solomon Raj, AELC made an Empirical research highlighting the new and indigenous missions, and Vijayam's effort falls in such line of indigenous missions to equip the grassroot Evangelists, which even the Old Testament Scholar, Victor Premasagar, CSI appreciated such initiatives.

== Life and background ==
Vijayam was born in 1933 in Giddaluru in erstwhile Madras Presidency during the colonial era to Bunyan Joseph, an Evangelist and grew up in rural India in the drought-prone Rayalaseema zone in southern India. The Church made an impact in the life of Vijayam as those were the days' of early Christians in the Telugu hinterland where the Catholic and the Protestant Missions had already set foot. Among the Protestant missions, the American Baptist Foreign Missionary Society, the London Missionary Society (LMS) and the Society for the Propagation of the Gospel (SPG) were the Christian missions at work in the Rayalaseema area. Vijayam grew up in a Christian household in mission compounds of the Churches as his father was a Priest, Canon and later Bishop. When Vijayam moved to Waltair in the 1950s, he also took part in the fellowship gatherings of the Canadian Baptist Ministries (Convention of Baptist Churches of Northern Circars).

== Education and career ==
=== Education ===
After initial studies in schools across Andhra Pradesh, wherever his father (Bunyan Joseph) was transferred, Vijayam moved to Madras Christian College, Tambaram for a pre-University course (PUC). For undergraduate studies, he enrolled at Andhra University, Waltair, in 1953 and pursued graduate and postgraduate courses specialising in Geology. He was a direct student of Professor Calamur Mahadevan and U. Aswathanarayana and imbibed the subtle nuances for research which infused in him a flair for scientific research throughout his career in geological sciences. One of his companions during his study days at Waltair included the Theologian G. D. Melanchthon, AELC. Vijayam was awarded with an MSc in 1957.

Vijayam also pursued a PhD programme during his early years at Osmania University, Secunderabad, on the topic Sedimentation in the upper proterozoic near Kurnool under the supervision of Prof. S. Balakrishna and was awarded a doctorate in the year 1965. He also spent time at Northwestern University, Evanston (United States) as a Postdoctoral researcher through the benevolence of Fulbright Program and also published a research article, Tectonic framework of sedimentation in the northwestern part of the San Andreqa fault zone at Park field, California on his return to India.

=== Career ===
Vijayam joined the ranks of Geological Survey of India in 1961. He then moved to academics and joined Osmania University, Secunderabad, A State-run university, where he also pursued a PhD programme. In 1965 and became a lecturer in the same university. Over the years, he rose to the ranks of a reader and professor and in 1984, he became head of the Department of Geology and chairperson of the board of studies.

== Articles published ==
During the three decades, beginning with the 1960s, Vijayam researched together with his fellow geologists and brought out different aspects of the Earth's rich resources to the fore. He was also managing editor of Journal of Indian Academy of Geoscience during the 1970s.

=== 1960–1969 ===
- Vijayam, B. E.; Aswathanarayana, U.; Mahadevan, Calamur (1960). "Sand movement on the Waltair beach, Visakhapatnam, India" (PDF). Physical Sciences. 26. ISSN 0370-0046.
- Vijayam, B. E. (May 1964). "Transgressing marine beach in Cuddapah basin, South of Kurnool, A. P." (PDF). Current Science. 33 (9). Bangalore. ISSN 0011-3891. OCLC 1565678.
- Vijayam, B. E. (1964). "Sedimentary petrographic analysis of Gulcheru conglomerate, Kurnool district, A.P." Journal of Indian Geology Association. 4.
- Vijayam, B. E. (5 January 1968). "An interesting dyke near archaean-Cuddapah Boundary, Veldurthi, Kurnool District, A. P." (PDF). Current Science. 37 (1). Bangalore. ISSN 0011-3891. OCLC 1565678.
- Vijayam, B. E. (1968). "Tectonic framework of sedimentation in the northwestern part of the San Andreqa fault zone at Park field, California" (PDF). Journal of Osmania University (Science). Golden Jubilee Volume. Secunderabad.
- Kamal, M. Y.; Vijayam, B. E. (1968). "Sedimentary tectonics of the Kurnool Cuddapah basin". Acta Carsologica. 6 (2). Hyderabad: NGRI. doi:10.3986/ac.v40i3.5.
- Balakrishna, S.; Vijayam, B. E. (1968). "Sedimentation of non-clastics in the western part of the Cuddapah basin". Acta Carsologica. 6 (2). Hyderabad: NGRI. doi:10.3986/ac.v40i3.5.
- Vijayam, B. E. (5 March 1968). "Worm Burrows in Narji Limestones, near Govindinne, Kurnool District, A. P." (PDF). Current Science. 37 (5). Bangalore. ISSN 0011-3891. OCLC 1565678.
- Vijayam, B. E. (1969). Plutonic rocks in the Cuddapah basin. Vol. 11. Journal of the Indian Geoscience Association. ISBN 9781862393455.
- Vijayam, B. E. (1969). "Occurrence of Tuffisites in Pebble Dyke, Ulindakonda, Kurnool district, Andhra Pradesh" (PDF). 5. Geological Society of India.

=== 1970–1979 ===
- Vijayam, B. E. (1973). "Geological Time Scale". Journal of the Andhra Pradesh Academy of Sciences. 9. Hyderabad.
- Reddy, P. H.; Vijayam, B. E. (1974). "Environmental significance of clay minerals in Auk and Nandyal shales of Palnad Basin". Indian Mineralogist. 15.
- Janardan Rao, Y.; Vijayam, B. E.; Narasimham, J. S. V. L. (1974). "Natural and human influence on the hydrological cycle in South India" (PDF).
- Vijayam, B. E. (1974). "Sedimentary tectonics of Kurnool Group: in Evolution of orogenic belts of India and geological history of platform areas". The Quarterly Journal of the Geological, Mining, and Metallurgical Society of India.
- Janardan Rao, Y.; Vijayam, B. E.; Ch., Sudarsana Raju (1975). "Optimum design of dug wells in hard rock terrains". Indian Farming.
- Vijayam, B. E.; Reddy, P. H. (December 1976). "Tectonic Framework of Sedimentation in the Western Part of the Palnad Basin, Andhra Pradesh". Journal of Geological Society of India. 17 (4). Bangalore.
- Vijayam, B. E.; Stephen George, T. (January 1978). "On the Occurrence of Barite in Kurnool District". Journal of Geological Survey of India. 19 (1).
- Vijayam, B. E.; Deshpande, Y. R. (1979). "Lithofacies Analysis of Barakar Formation of Kothagudem Area, (A. P.) India". 2. Geological Survey of India.

=== 1980–1989 ===
- Madhavan Nair, K.; Vijayam, B. E. (October 1980). "Sedimentology of Limestones in Niniyur Formation, Paleocene, Cauvery Basin, South India". Journal of Geological Society of India. 21 (10). Bangalore.
- Vijayam, B. E.; Kamal, M. Y.; K., Veeriah (1981). "Sedimentation in the Kurnool group". Hyderabad: Indian Institute of Peninsular Geology. doi:10.1007/s12665-017-6972-3. S2CID 134903918.
- Osmani, A. S.; Vijayam, B. E. (1981). "X-ray diffraction studies of the Intertrappean Fuller's Earth, Alipur, Vikarabad". The Indian Mineralogist. 21–25.
- Madhavan Nair, K.; Vijayam, B. E. (1981). "Depositional and diagenetic characteristics of reef and flank facies, a comparative study in the Lower Cretaceous limestones in Kallakkudi Embayment, Cauvery Basin". Bulletin of the Oil and Natural Gas Commission. 18 (1).
- Kamal, M. Y.; Vijayam, B. E. (20 February 1982). "Intraformational conglomerate of the Banganapalle formation, Kurnool group" (PDF). Current Science. 51 (4). Bangalore. ISSN 0011-3891. OCLC 1565678.
- Shyam Prasad, Mokkapati; Kamal, M. Y.; Vijayam, B. E. (1982). "Study of beach profiles of Nizampatnam Bay". Geoviews. 9.
- Shyam Prasad, Mokkapati; Prabhakar, K; Kamal, M. Yusuf; Vijayam, B. E. (March 1982). "A Study of the Movement of Beach Sand at Nizampatnam Bay by Tracer Techniques". Journal of Geological Survey of India. 23 (3). Bangalore.
- Kamal, M. Y.; Vijayam, B. E. (1982). "Intraformational conglomerate of the Banganapalle Formation, Kurnool Group" (PDF). Current Science. 51 (4). Bangalore.
- Vijayam, B. E. (1985). "Sedimentary tectonic history of Cuddapah Basin". Journal of the Indian Association of Sedimentologists. 5.

=== 1990–1999 ===
- Vijayam, B. E. (1992). "Mobilizing the Laity". Chennai: Mission India 2000.
- Vijayam, B. E. (1992). "Tentmaker Evangelism". Chennai: Mission India 2000.
- Linda Prabhakar Babu, B.; Vijayam, B. E. (1996). "Geochemistry and sedimentology of cherts and its associated carbonate rocks of Mallampalli Formations of Pakhal Super Group" (PDF). The International Symposium of Applied Geochemistry.

== Other initiatives ==
In addition to his academic pursuits, Vijayam was involved in founding entities as a means to bring in development in rural areas. Vijayam himself hailed from a rural family and his career pursuits brought him to an urban setting. In spite of it, he chose to better the lives of those in special circumstances. Towards this end, he drew talent from universities as a matter of service and also sought the partnership of United Nations Development Programme, Government of India, and other funding agencies. In 1982, he also went to Bangla Desh to see the work of Social Entrepreneur and Nobel laureate Muhammad Yunus. In 2012, two sets of researchers working independent of each other had written about the work of Vijayam beyond the portals of learning.

A University of Hyderabad researcher, Gadde Peda Rattaiah referred to the work of Vijayam in the context of partnerships with United Nations Development Programme and writes,

Professor Vijayam was a retired professor of Geology who worked, at the Department of Geology, Osmania University in Hyderabad. He founded MERIBA, PROGRESS, TENT, JVI, I-WILL agencies and his approach to poverty alleviation in rural India, was inspired by the Judeo-Christian values approach and was promoting attitudes of love, unity, mutual respect, self-help and collective action to overcome the hindrances to human deprivation, poverty and suffering.

Similarly, a group of Earth scientists regarded the work of Vijayam in connecting Geology with development and write,

Community development initiatives without adequate geological input are potentially doomed to failure. For many years now, wonderful counterexamples have functioned under the guidance of distinguished geologist B. E. Vijayam in India. Vijayam's NGO creations, including PROGRESS and TENT, integrate geological principles into almost every aspect of holistic rural development. Many of the village-level projects under TENT are planned to consider improvements in the context of a unified watershed. Water sources, sanitation, erosion, agriculture, land-use planning, and energy provision are all analyzed and managed as components of a larger, single geological system.

=== MERIBA ===
During 1978 Vijayam founded Mission to Encourage Rural Development in Backward Areas (MERIBA) as an entity to bring forth development in select areas of drought-prone Rayalaseema area of Andhra Pradesh amidst caste-ridden hegemony. The work of MERIBA was taken up in Kurnool district in the villages of Balapanuru, Kouluru, Neravada, Bhimaram and Yerraguntla. For organising Dalits through participatory management initiatives through Sarvodaya Sanghams, Vijayam's entity was also locked in horns with those oppressing the Dalits. There was indeed some resistance to the reformation that MERIBA ought to bring in and even the State executive was found to be in tandem with those oppressing the Dalits. It took judicial intervention to get the oppressors behind bars, but in no time they were freed and were ready to seek vengeance, but for the timely presence of Vijayam who sought reconciliation, an act which stunned the oppressors. Incidentally, Nagi Reddy, an advocate by profession, became MERIBA's first project director, and there was renewed activism in taking legal recourse in curbing atroticities on Dalits through SC/ST (Prevention of Atrocities) Act.

=== PROGRESS ===
By 1982, Vijayam founded Peoples Research Organization for Grass-root Environmental Scientific Services (PROGRESS) as a platform to share the benefits of technological advancement with the rural poor. Select case studies and stories relating to the success of PROGRESS had been documented in 1994 by National Afforestation and Eco-Development Board and there also had been significant contribution by scientists working in PROGRESS to the environmental studies. In 1996, P. Sita Janki and K. Sumalini contributed a paper entitled Enhancement of seed germination in Amla (Emblica officinalis Gaertn.) by different growth regulator treatments that appeared in the Journal for Tropical Forestry. A 2007 report of the University Grants Commission (UGC) listed PROGRESS among those NGOs supported by it in advancing Rural development. PROGRESS was a member in the National Institute of Hydrology, Roorkee.

=== TENT ===
The Theologians, F. Hrangkhuma and Sebastian Kim had recognised the efforts of Vijayam towards Tentmaking. At the same time, Roger Hedlund had acknowledged Vijayam's efforts towards founding TENT in equipping individuals with means of livelihood as well as basic theological principles. It was in 1985 that Vijayam founded Training in Evangelism Needs and Technology (TENT), intertwining technology with theology for ministerial advancement, which the notable Entomologist P. Judson has also been associated.

== See also ==
- Prof. Dr. C. Mahadevan, D.Sc. (Madras),
- Prof. Dr. M. Abel, PhD (California),
- Prof. Dr. U. Aswathanarayana, D. Sc. (Andhra),
- Prof. T. D. J. Nagabhushanam, PhD (IARI),
- Prof. P. A. James, PhD (Osmania),
- Dr. J. A. Oliver, PhD (ANGRAU),
- Prof. P. Judson, PhD (Osmania)

Academic offices
Preceded by C. Leelanandam; 1983–1985	Head of the Department of Geology, Osmania University, Hyderabad; 1985–1987	Succeeded by G. Shankaranarayana; 1987–1989
Awards
Preceded by A. D. Karve, 1994	Prof. Bal Dattatreya Tilak Endowment Lecture, Indian National Science Academy, New Delhi; 1995	Succeeded by K. J. Ranadive, 1996
