= Karnati Lingaiah =

Indian Writer in Economics and Telugu Literature

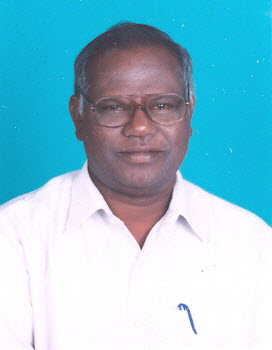
- Born: 10 June 1944 (age 82); Nalgonda District, Telangana, India

Academic background
- Education: Osmania University, Kakatiya University
- Awards: State Best Teacher Award by Government of Andhra Pradesh, India.

Dr. Karnati Lingaiah born on 10 June 1944 in Narasimhapuram Village, Nalgonda District, Telangana, India. He is a retired Lecturer in Economics and recipient of State Best Teacher Award given by Government of Andhra Pradesh, India in 1984. He is also a poet who has written books in Telugu Language. He has authored about 17 books in Economics and 18 books in Telugu Literature.

== Early life and education ==
Dr. Karnati Lingaiah born on 10 June 1944 to Sri K. Chennaiah and Smt. K. Venkamma. He obtained his Bachelor of Arts degree in 1969, Master of Arts in Economics in 1972, Master of Philosophy in 1978 from Osmania University, Hyderabad, Telangana, India and later he obtained Doctor of Philosophy in 1987 from Kakatiya University, Warangal, Telangana, India.

== Career ==
He started his career by joining as a lecturer in 1971 at Government Girls Junior College, Nalgonda, Telangana, India. Later he has been transferred to Government Degree College in Mancherial, Adilabad District, Telangana, India in 1972. He worked there for three years and then he has been transferred to Hyderabad in 1975 and until his retirement he has worked in Hyderabad. In Hyderabad he worked at New Government Junior College, Secunderabad and Government Junior College, S.P. Road, Secunderabad. During his career he was associated with Andhra Pradesh Lecturers Association by serving the association in various positions and also he was closely associated with students' communities. He has been awarded "State Best Teacher" award by Andhra Pradesh State Government, India in the year 1984 for his services in teaching profession. Apart from his teaching profession he has authored several books in Economics, Delivered speeches in All India Economic conferences, published many articles in various news papers and journals and delivered extension lectures in various other colleges. He was also involved in NCERT training programs in New Delhi. He has authored about 17 books in Economics which were prescribed nationwide in India. Some of his popular books are Rural Development in India, Indian Economy, Dictionary of Economics and Macro Economics. His name was also included in Who's Who of Indian Writers a book published by Sahitya Akademi, New Delhi, India an autonomous organisation which was initiated by Central Government of India.

== Telugu literature ==
Being an Economics Lecturer, he also has interest in his native language which is Telugu. He has authored about 18 books in Telugu Literature which were both in Prose and Poetry forms. He has been appreciated by many famous Telugu Poets for his works. He also started a literary organisation called Nandanavanam Sahiti Samithi, Hyderabad, India and through this literary organisation various books have been published and helped many young poets to get noticed through this organisation.

== List of books authored in economics ==
- Economic Development of India, published by Telugu Academy, Government of Andhra Pradesh, India in 1986 revised in 1995.
- Industrialiasation in Tribal Areas, published by RBSA Publishers, Jaipur, Rajasthan, India in 1988.
- Macro Economics, published by Pointer Publishers, Jaipur, Rajasthan, India in 1988.
- A Handbook of Economics in Telugu published by Dharani Publishers, Hyderabad, Telangana, India in 1989.
- Economic Development of India, published by Vignan Publishers, Guntur, Andhra Pradesh, India in 1990.
- Development Economics, published by Dharani Publishers, Hyderabad, Telangana, India in 1990.
- Indian Economy, published by Sterling Publishers, New Delhi, India in 1991.
- Dictionary of Economics, published by Link Publications, New Delhi, India in 1995.
- A Handbook of Economics in English, published by Aditya Publications, Hyderabad, Telangana, India in 1992.
- Issues in Economic Development, published by Pointer Publishers, Jaipur, Rajasthan, India in 1993.
- Economic Development and Planning, published by Lakshminarayan Agarwal Publishers, Agra, Uttar Pradesh, India in 1993.
- P.G. Foundation in English, published by Center for Distance Education, Osmania University, Hyderabad, Telangana, India in 1995.
- P.G. Foundation in Telugu, published by Center for Distance Education, Osmania University, Hyderabad, Telangana, India in 1998.
- Principles of Economics, published by S.Chand & Company Limited, New Delhi, India in 1999.
- Rural Development of India, published by Kalyani Publishers, New Delhi, India in 2000.
- Evolution of Indian Economy, published by S.Chand & Company Limited, New Delhi, India in 2000.
- Economic Growth and Development Models, published by S.Chand & Company Limited, New Delhi, India in 2000.

== List of articles published in journals/magazines in economics ==
- Great Indian Economists : Their Creative Vision for Socio-Economic Development (10 Vols-Set);Vol. 3. Dr. B.R. Ambedkar (1891-1956) : Life Sketch and Contribution to Indian Economy;Article 24 - Dr. B.R. Ambedkar's views on agrarian reforms/Karnati Lingaiah

== List of books authored in Telugu literature ==
- Virisina Moggalu, published by Bhasha Kuteeram, Literary Organisation, Hyderabad, Telangana, India in 1976.
- Maro Vasantham, published by Vasavi Sahitya Parishath, Literary Organisation, Hyderabad, Telangana, India in 1977.
- Manchi Kosam, published by Vasavi Sahitya Parishath, Literary Organisation, Hyderabad, Telangana, India in 1980.
- Telugu Talli Velugu Pandiri, published by Nandanavanam Sahithi Samithi, Hyderabad, Telangana, India in 1985.
- Endaro Desha Bhaktulu, published by Dharani Publications, Hyderabad, Telangana, India in 1990.
- Mano Ratham, published by Dharani Publications, Hyderabad, Telangana, India in 1992.
- Jeevana Satyam, published by Dharani Publications, Hyderabad, Telangana, India in 1995.
- Konaseema Toofan, published by Dharani Publications, Hyderabad, Telangana, India in 1996.
- Sneha Deepthi, published by Dharani Publications, Hyderabad, Telangana, India in 1997.
- Janma Bhoomi Geetaalu, published by Dharani Publications, Hyderabad, Telangana, India in 1997.
- Sri Ranganatha Shatakam, published by Nandanavanam Sahithi Samithi, Hyderabad, Telangana, India in 2005.
- Maa Vooru, published by Nandanavanam Sahithi Samithi, Hyderabad, Telangana, India in 2006.
- Sri Varada Venkatesha, published by Nandanavanam Sahithi Samithi, Hyderabad, Telangana, India in 2007.
- Konijeti Meeku Meere Saati, published by Vasavi Sahitya Parishath, Literary Organisation, Hyderabad, Telangana, India in 2010.
- Karnati Lingaiah Jeevana Rekhalu, Hyderabad, Telangana, India in 2012.
- Sri Krishna Divya Leelalu, published by Vasavi Sahitya Parishath, Literary Organisation, Hyderabad, Telangana, India in 2013.
- Nitya Paarayana Shlokamulu, published by Nandanavanam Sahithi Samithi, Hyderabad, Telangana, India in 2013.
- Sri Paramaananda Daayaka, Sri Ranganathaa, published by Vasavi Sahitya Parishath, Literary Organisation, Hyderabad, Telangana, India in 2014.
- Sri Parvathi Vallabhaa! Shiva! Maam Paahi.. Sadaa!, published by Vasavi Sahitya Parishath, Literary Organisation, Hyderabad, Telangana, India in 2014.
- Naanila Pushpaalu, Hyderabad, Telangana, India in 2015.
- Merupulu, Hyderabad, Telangana, India in 2015.
- Telangana Teajaalu, Hyderabad, Telangana, India in 2016.
- Abhinandana Maalika, Hyderabad, Telangana, India in 2016.
- Mana Telangana (Geya Samputi), Hyderabad, Telangana, India in 2018.
- Mother (Geya Samputi - in English), Hyderabad, Telangana, India in 2018.
- Sri Lakshmi Narasimha Vachanaalu, Hyderabad, Telangana, India in 2018.
- Karnati Vajra Vyjayanthi, Hyderabad, Telangana, India in 2019.
- Nava Bharatha Nirmatha PV... Deshaanike Teevi, Hyderabad, Telangana, India in 2020.
- Sri Vasavi Kanyaka Parameshwari Vruthaantham (Charitra), Hyderabad, Telangana, India in 2021.
- Harivillu (Vachana Kaavyam), Hyderabad, Telangana, India in 2022.
- Karnati Lingaiah - A Biography, Hyderabad, Telangana, India in 2022.
- Aadhyatmika Ramayanam - Mahatmyam (Vyaasa Samputi), Hyderabad, Telangana, India in 2023.

== Awards and honours ==
- State Best Teacher Award awarded by Government of Andhra Pradesh, India, 1984.
- Young Poet Award, Vasavi Club, Hyderabad, Telangana, India, 1984–85.
- Best Writer Award, Nandanavanam Sahiti Samithi, Hyderabad, Telangana, India, 1986–87.
- Social Worker Award, Arya Vysya Maha Sabha, Hyderabad, Telangana, India, 1987–88.
- Educational Excellence 2000 Millennium Award, Osmania University Employees Cultural Association, Osmania University, Hyderabad, Telangana, India, 2000.
