= Alfred James =

Alfred James may refer to:

- Alfred Arthur James (1887–1938), member of Queensland Legislative Assembly
- Alfred Francis James (1918–1992), Australian publisher
- Pilli Alfred James (1931–1983), Indian academic
