= Pilli Alfred James =

Indian academic

Professor P. Alfred James Ph.D. (Osmania)
- Born: 17 August 1931; Narasapur, Andhra Pradesh
- Died: 3 May 1983 (aged 51); Warangal, Telangana
- Resting place: Christian Cemetery, Hanumakonda; 17°59′17.5″N 79°33′00.1″E
- Other names: Pilli Alfred James, P. A. James
- Citizenship: Indian
- Education: B. Sc. Honours (Andhra), M. A. (Nagpur), LL.B. (Nagpur), Ph.D. (Osmania)
- Alma mater: Andhra University, Waltair (Andhra Pradesh); Nagpur University, Nagpur (Maharashtra), Osmania University, Secunderabad (Telangana)
- Known for: Building up Kakatiya University
- Awards: Andhra Pradesh State Best Teacher Award (1980)
- Scientific career
- Fields: Public administration
- Workplaces: Warangal (Telangana)
- Thesis: Municipal administration in Andhra Pradesh
- Doctoral advisor: M. A. Muthalib
- Other academic advisors: M. P. Sharma

P. Alfred James (1931–1983) was an Indian Academic, best known for his association with the Kakatiya University, a State-run University u/s 2 (f) of the University Grants Commission Act, 1956 where he was Professor and Head of the Department of Public Administration in the 1970s. He was also a member of the Indian Institute of Public Administration in which he was an active member, chairing sessions of its annual workshops. The Institute condoled his sudden death in 1983. As part of his research forte, he also used to contribute his writings (see section on writings below) to many journals and was also a book reviewer in the Indian Journal of Public Administration.

It was only in 1976 that the Kakatiya University was founded in Warangal with Kailasa Venkata Ramiah as the first Vice-Chancellor. The faculty were much inspired to take their respective departments to new heights by improvising on the academics and contributed much towards scholarship. The public administration department was one such faculty which gave impetus to new Scholars. Alfred James broke new ground in research and mentored many Scholars.

Alfred James had a cross-cultural academic record studying in three different universities and had been guided and mentored by various Scholars. The Old Testament Scholar, E. C. John, a recipient of the prestigious Alexander von Humboldt Foundation research fellowship in the 1960s wrote that it had been a tradition in Germany for students to study in as many universities as possible under different Scholars and deepen their understanding and inculcate a sense of scholarship. Such has been the academic pursuit of Alfred James, that he had not only been a Scholar in north India studying under able Scholars, but also studied in south India and gained profound knowledge and a flair for research from his Professors. Later on in his career, he could easily relate himself in national proceedings in matters of public administration where his contribution has been substantial.

== Early life and studies ==
Alfred James was born in Narsapur, West Godavari district in Andhra Pradesh on 17 August 1931 and was raised a Christian as a member of the Lutheran community. After scholastic studies, he pursued sciences at Andhra University, waltair, where he graduated with a B. Sc. (Honours) in 1951. Prof. M. Kistaiah, writing in the memorial volume to his honour, brings out the fact that Alfred James was for sometime employed in Ceylon.

He then showed interest for pursuing higher University education and enrolled at the Nagpur University for a postgraduation in Public Administration under Professor M. P. Sharma, a notable academic. After passing through with an M. A., he also seemed to have pursued a course in jurisprudence leading to LL.B.

Professor Alfred James began his doctoral studies at Osmania University where he submitted his dissertation entitled Municipal administration in Andhra Pradesh and was awarded a Ph. D. in the year 1966

== Teaching ==
Alfred James began teaching at his alma mater, Osmania University in the Department of Public Administration where he initially was a Lecturer. Later, he became a Reader He was active in the local academic forums.

From 1972 to 1976, Alfred James was Professor and Head of the Post graduate Centre, Warangal. He later became Head of the Department of Public Administration.

During his tenure at the Kakatiya University, Prof. James was of the rank of Professor and guided many students in their doctoral studies.

== Legacy and reminisce ==
With the sudden death of Alfred James in the University on 3 May 1983, colleagues and students came together and instituted an annual Endowment in honour of P. A. James by which annual lectures are taking place at the Kakatiya University through public discourses by doyens of public administration, who are being invited to lecture. During the 12th endowment, Prof. D. Ravindra Prasad of Administrative Staff College of India presented a paper entitled Our urban futures: Towards Good Governance and Sustainability. The said endowment lectures continue to benefit not only the new Scholars in their research, but also to the emerging trends in public administration.

A couple of years' after his death, colleagues of Alfred James, who once were his students, came again together and contributed essays to his memory which was published in 1986 under the title, Public policy and administration: Essays in memory of Prof. P. A. James. This was simultaneously reviewed in The Indian Journal of Political Science in 1986 and Yojana in 1987. The contributory volume has reached far and wide and available in nearly 50 major university library holdings across the globe.

Prof. M. Kistaiah in the preface to Public policy and administration: Essays in memory of Prof. P.A. James, which was published in 1986, reminisces,

The Teacher and serious Researcher in him had left an indelible mark on the minds of his numerous students and associates. A distinguished Social Scientist and a thorough gentleman. Professor James had a perfect harmony in his life as a devout Christian of the Lutheran order.

== Articles published ==
=== In books ===
- James, P. A. & Amrutha Rao, A. (1991). "Chester I. Barnard". In Ravindra Prasad, D.; Prasad, V. S. & Satyanarayana, P. (eds.). Administrative Thinkers. Sterling. pp. 136–150. ISBN 9788120709614.
- James, P. A. (1983). "Politics-Administration Nexus in India: A Note". In Kaushik, S. L. & Sahni, Pradeep (eds.). Public Administration in India: Emerging Trends. Kitab Mahal.
- James, P. A. (1979). "Apartheid— Its Legal Framework and Political Impact". Twentyfifth Annual Report 1978-1979. Indian Institute of Public Administration.
- James, P. A. (1975). "State control through supersession and dissolution". In Sharma, S. K. & Chawla, V. N. (eds.). Municipal Administration in India: Some reflections. International. pp. 175–187.

=== In journals ===
- James, P. A.; Murlidhar Rao, A. (1972). "The councillors and the. commissioners in Hyderabad : their roles and relations". Nagarlok. 4 (1, January–March).
- James, P. A.; Amrutha Rao, A. (1972). "The Andhra Pradesh Municipalities Act, 1965: An analysis". Nagarlok. 4 (3, July–September).
- James, P. A. (1973). "Municipal tax collection". Nagarlok. 5 (2, April–June).
- James, P. A.; Sreenivas Reddy, A. (1979). "Commissioner for Scheduled Castes and Scheduled Tribes". Economic and Political Weekly. 14 (26): 1100–1104. ISSN 0012-9976. JSTOR 4367742.
- James, P. A. (1978). "Harijans and rural Government". Administrative Change. 6.
- James, P. A.; Bhaskara Rao, V. (1972). "Andhra Pradesh Government Employees: An experiment in civil service unionism". Journal of the National Academy of Administration. XVII (3).
- James, P. A.; Bhaskara Rao, V. (1971). "Unionism in P & T and Audit Departments". Indian Journal of Industrial Relations. 7 (3).
- James, P. A. (1971). "The Second Strike by the Central Government Employees: Some Demands". Indian Journal of Industrial Relations. 7 (3).
- James, P. A.; Murlidhar Rao, A. (April 1970). "Mayoralty in India : no case for more powers". Journal of Administration Overseas. 9 (2).
- James, P. A. (1969). "Forms of municipal government in Andhra Pradesh: a study in organisational analysis and evolution". Journal of Administration Overseas. 8 (3, July).

== See also ==
- Prof. Dr. M. Abel, Ph.D. (California),
- Prof. Dr. T. D. J. Nagabhushanam, Ph.D. (IARI),
- Dr. J. A. Oliver, Ph.D. (ANGRAU),
- Prof. Dr. B. E. Vijayam, Ph.D. (Osmania),
- Prof. Dr. P. Judson, Ph.D. (Osmania)

Academic offices
Preceded by G. Ram Reddy, 1968–1977	Head of the department, Public Administration and Human Resource Management, Kakatiya University, Warangal; 1977–?	Succeeded by
