= National Commission for Minorities =

Indian government commission

- NCM
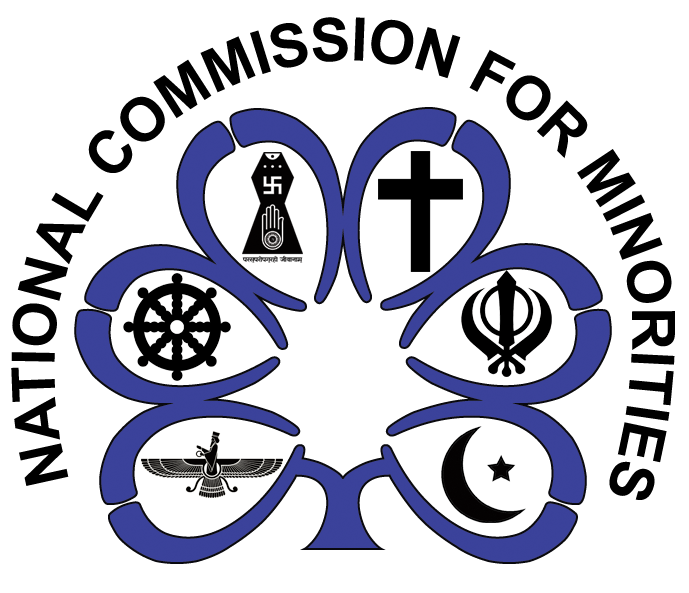

Commission overview
- Formed: 17 May 1993; 33 years ago
- Preceding Commission: Minorities Commission 1978
- Jurisdiction: Republic of India
- Headquarters: New Delhi, India
- Annual budget: ₹5,020.50 crore (US$540 million) (2022–23) including Ministry of Minority Affairs
- Minister responsible: Kiren Rijiju
- Deputy Minister responsible: George Kurian
- Commission executive: Harjit Singh Grewal
- Parent Commission: Ministry of Minority Affairs
- Website: ncm.nic.in

The National Commission for Minorities (NCM) is a statutory body under the Ministry of Minority Affairs, Government of India, established in 1993. It is responsible for safeguarding the interests of minorities—Buddhists, Christians, Jains, Muslims, Sikhs, and Zoroastrians (Parsis).

== History ==
The Union Government set up the National Commission for Minorities (NCM) under the National Commission for Minorities Act, 1992. Six religious communities, viz; Buddhists, Christians, Jains, Muslims, Sikhs, and Zoroastrians (Parsis) have been notified in Gazette of India as minority communities by the Union Government all over India. Original notification of 1993 was for five religious communities: Sikhs, Buddhists, Parsis, Christians and Muslims; later in 2014, Jains were also added. As per Census 2001, these six communities consist of 18.8% of the country's population.

As of December 2025, the position of chairperson and members remain vacant and there are uncertainties regarding this body. A Public Interest Litigation (PIL) has been filed in the Delhi High Court to issue a mandamus to government to reconstitute the body and the Court has asked for a response from the government. Tahir Mahmood, the former NCM Chairman and the member of Law Commission of India has commented:

Its history of 47 years shows that whatever little the minorities of the country can expect in terms of the constitutional provisions for their rights as equal citizens of the country can never be secured through intervention by the toothless tiger called the NCM. So, if it is thrown into the dustbin of history, it will be worthless to shed tears on its unceremonious exit from the national scene.

== UN Declaration ==
The NCM adheres to the United Nations Declaration on the Rights of Persons Belonging to National or Ethnic, Religious and Linguistic Minorities of 18 December 1992 which states that "States shall protect the existence of the National or Ethnic, Cultural, Religious and Linguistic identity of minorities within their respective territories and encourage conditions for the promotion of that identity."

== List of chairpersons ==
List of Chairpersons of National Commission for Minorities
Nos.	Name	Portrait	Prime Minister	Appointment date	Retirement date
1.	Sardar Ali Khan		P. V. Narasimha Rao	5 July 1993	4 July 1996
2.	Tahir Mahmood			1996	1999
3.	Mohd Shamim			2000	2003
4.	Tarlochan Singh		Manmohan Singh	2003	2006
5.	Mohammad Hamid Ansari		Manmohan Singh	2006	July 2007
6.	Syed Ghayorul Hasan Rizvi		Narendra Modi	26 May 2017	25 May 2020
7.	Mukhtar Abbas Naqvi		Narendra Modi	25 May 2020	12 April 2022
8.	Iqbal Singh Lalpura		Narendra Modi	13 April 2022	22 April 2025
9.	Harjit Singh Grewal		Narendra Modi	22 July 2026	

== Functions and powers ==
The commission has the following functions:

1. Evaluate the progress of the development of Minorities under the Union and States.
2. Monitor the working of the safeguards provided in the Constitution and in laws enacted by Parliament and the State Legislatures.
3. Make recommendations for the effective implementation of safeguards for the protection of the interests of minorities by the central Government or the state governments.
4. Look into specific complaints regarding deprivation of rights and safeguards of the minorities and take up such matters with the appropriate authorities.
5. Cause studies to be undertaken into problems arising out of any discrimination against minorities and recommend measures for their removal.
6. Conduct studies, research and analysis on the issues relating to socio-economic and educational development of minorities.
7. Suggest appropriate measures in respect of any minority to be undertaken by the central government or the state governments.
8. Make periodical or special reports to the Central Government on any matter pertaining to minorities and in particular the difficulties confronted by them.
9. Any other matter which may be referred to it by the Central Government.

The commission has the following powers:

- Summoning and enforcing the attendance of any person from any part of India and examining him on oath.
- Requiring the discovery and production of any document.
- Receiving evidence on affidavit.
- Requisitioning any public record or copy thereof from any court or office.
- Issuing commissions for the examination of witnesses and documents.

== Composition ==
The act states that the Commission shall consist of:

- a chairperson,
- a Vice Chairperson and
- Five Members to be nominated by the central government from amongst persons of eminence, ability and integrity; provided that five members including the chairperson shall be from amongst the minority communities.

== Demographics ==
As per the Census 2011, the percentage of minorities in the country is about 19.3% of the total population of the country. The population of:

- Muslims 14.2%
- Christians 2.3%
- Sikhs 1.7%
- Buddhists 0.7%
- Jain 0.4%
- Parsis 0.006%

== Rights and safeguards of minorities ==
Although the Indian Constitution does not define the word minority, it has provided constitutional safeguards and fundamental rights to minorities:

=== Under Fundamental Rights Part III of Indian Constitution ===
Indian state is committed to administer these rights which can be enforced by judiciary

1. Right of ‘any section of the citizens’ to ‘conserve’ its ‘distinct language, script or culture’; [Article 29(1)]
2. Right of all Religious and Linguistic Minorities to establish and administer educational institutions of their choice;[Article 30(1)]
3. Freedom of Minority-managed educational institutions from discrimination in the matter of receiving aid from the State;[Article30(2)]

=== Under Part XVII Official Language of Indian Constitution ===
1. Rights for any section of population for language spoken by them; [Article 347]
2. Provision for facilities of instruction in mother tongue; [Article 350A]
3. Provisioning a special officer for linguistic minorities and defining his duties; [ Article 350B]

== Sachar Committee Report ==
On 9 March 2005 the then Prime Minister issued a notification for the constitution of a high level committee to prepare a report on the social, economic and educational status of the Muslim community of India. Recommendations contained in the Report of the High Level Committee on Social, Economic and Educational Status of the Muslim Community of India headed by Justice Rajinder Sachar (Retd.):

1. Need for transparency, monitoring and data availability: Create a National Data Bank (NDB) where all relevant data for various socio-religious categories are maintained.
2. Enhancing the legal basis for providing equal opportunities: Set up an Equal Opportunity Commission to look into grievances of deprived groups like minorities.
3. Shared spaces, need to enhance diversity: The idea of providing certain incentives to a 'diversity index' should be explored.
4. Education: A process of evaluating the content of the school text books needs to be initiated to purge them of explicit and implicit content that may impart inappropriate social values, especially religious intolerance. Need to ensure that all children in the age group 0-14 have access to free and high quality education.
5. High quality government schools should be set up in all areas of Muslim concentration. Exclusive schools for girls should be set up, particularly for the 9-12 standards. This would facilitate higher participation of Muslim girls in school education. In co-education schools more women teachers need to be appointed.
6. Provide primary education in Urdu in areas where Urdu speaking population is concentrated.
7. Mechanisms to link madarsas with higher secondary school board.
8. Recognise degrees from madarsas for eligibility in Defence Services, Civil Services and Banking examinations.
9. Increase employment share of Muslims, particularly where there is great deal of public dealing.
10. Enhancing participation in governance: Appropriate state level laws can be enacted to ensure minority representation in local bodies
11. Create a nomination procedure to increase participation of minorities in public bodies.
12. Establish a delimitation procedure that does not reserve constituencies with high minority population for SCs.
13. Enhancing access to credit and government programmes: Provide financial and other support to initiatives built around occupations where Muslims are concentrated and that have growth potential.
14. Improve participation and share of minorities, particularly Muslims, in business of regular commercial banks.
15. Improving employment opportunities and conditions.

The Committee suggested that policies should "sharply focus on inclusive development and 'mainstreaming' of the Community while respecting diversity."
