= Kothapalli Jayashankar =

Indian writer

- Born: 6 August 1934; Akkampet, Atmakur mandal, Warangal district
- Died: 21 June 2011 (aged 76); Hanamkonda
- Children: Brahmam (Adopted Son)

Kothapalli Jayashankar (6 August 1934 – 21 June 2011), popularly known as Professor Jayashankar, was an Indian academic and social activist. He was a leading ideologue of the Telangana Movement. He fought for a separate state beginning in 1952. He often stated that the unequal distribution of river water was the root cause of the separate Telangana movement. He was the former Vice-Chancellor of Kakatiya University and an activist in the Separate Telangana Movement.

Prof. Jayashankar Telangana State Agricultural University (PJTSAU), named in honour and memory of Professor Jayashankar, is the only farm University of Telangana state which came into being in the event of the bifurcation from Acharya N. G. Ranga Agricultural University.

== Early life ==
Kothapalli Jayashankar was born in Akkampet village, Atmakur mandal, Warangal in the Hyderabad State to Lakshmikantha Rao and Mahalakshmi of the Vishwakarma community. He did his schooling in Hanamkonda, Warangal and his MA in Economics at Banaras Hindu University, MA in Economics at Aligarh Muslim University, PhD in Economics at Osmania University, and BEd at Osmania university in Hyderabad.

== Life ==
During the Nizam rule in Hyderabad state, it was mandatory for all schools to sing a song praising the Nizam. When the headmaster of the Markaji High School in Hanamkonda asked his students to sing the song, Jayashankar, then a Class 6 student, defied the rule and sang Vandemataram.

His biography, Voduvani Muchchata, written by Kompelli Venkat Goud, was released by KCR and other prominent personalities.

=== Telangana movement ===
As a young student of intermediate, Jayashankar walked out of his class in protest against state reorganisation in 1952. He also started in a bus to participate in the 1952 Mulkhi Agitation. In 1962, he was part of a campaign which rocked the region. He joined the movement for a separate Telangana state in 1952, when he was a student leader.

As a lecturer, in 1968, he participated in the revived agitation. He carried out his struggle for Telangana through research and academic studies, and by educating people on the cause. He is known as the original Telangana ideologue. He led several agitations since 1962, transforming into a mass movement after the 1969 agitation.

He was associated with the Telangana movement efforts to obtain statehood for Telangana since 1952, stating with Non-Mulki go back and Idli Sambar go back movement. He wanted the "Puri Muttor" to populate the lands of Telangana. In 1969 Jayashankar formed a ten-member team, in consultation with Prof. Rawada Satyannaraya, to contribute as intellectuals during the fight for Telangana and not be Silent Spectators any more. These included Prof. Anand Rao Thota, Prof. Parmaji and Prof. Sreedhara Swamy. Swamy was Jayashanker's childhood classmate and friend; both of them studied in Warangal, and did MA together at Benaras Hindu University. Swamy was active during the formation of Telangana State and was awarded the "Uttama Vidya Vetha" by Hon'ble Chief Minister, Telangana, Sri. KCR during the first anniversary celebration of the formation of Telangana for his contributions as a teacher for Telangana.

Prof. Jayashankar then started Telangana Janasabha. It was banned by the Indian government. He authored many articles and research papers, in English and Telugu, on various aspects of the Telangana problem.

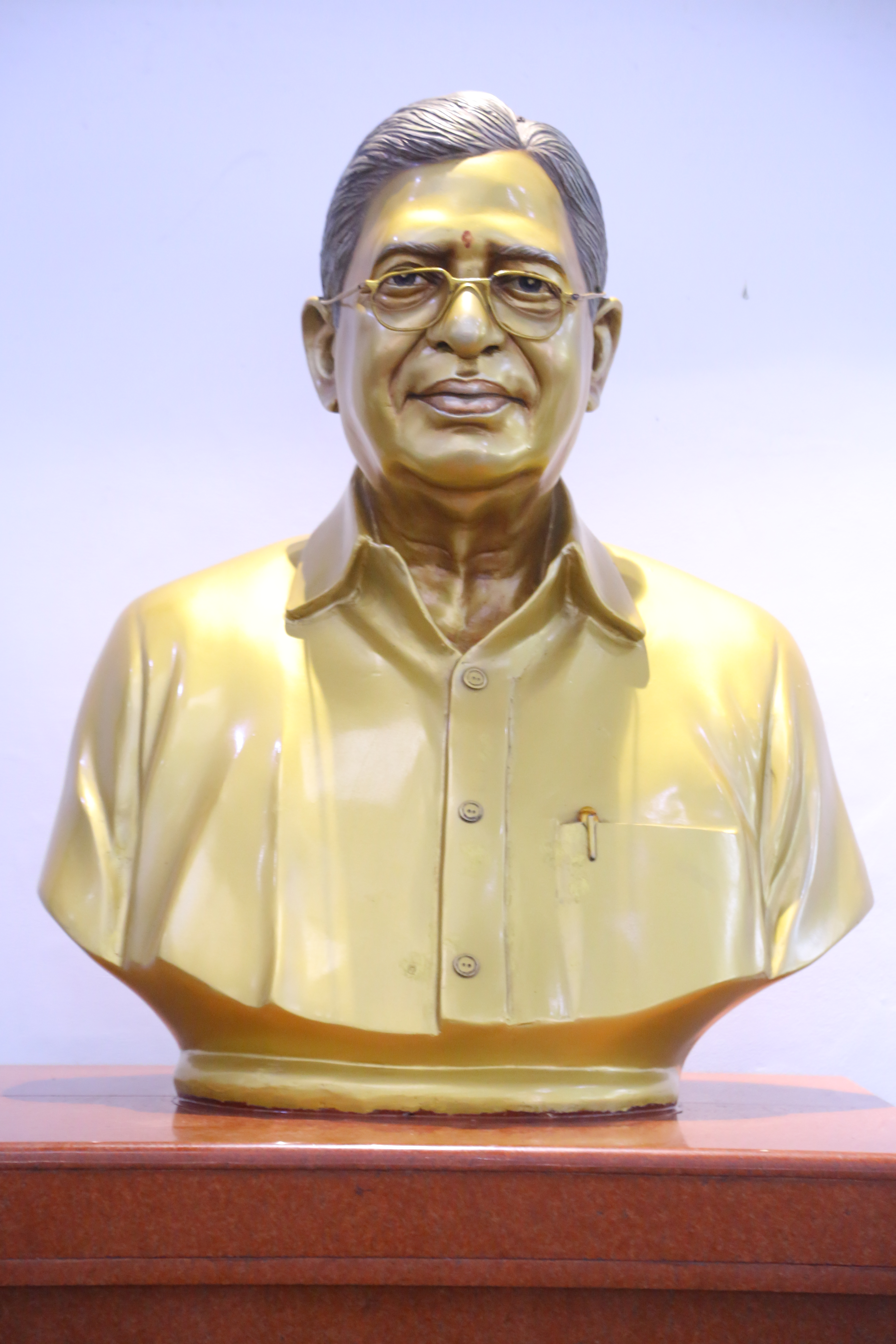
Jayashankar Statue in Telangana Bhavan, Hyderabad

He was instrumental in forming the Telangana Development Forum (TDF, USA) in 1999. He was invited by the American Telugu Association (ATA) to speak about the problems of regional disparities in Andhra Pradesh in July 2000 and July 2002. He was invited by the Telangana Development Forum (TDF) USA to give a series of lectures on various facets of the Telangana Movement in ten major cities of the United States during July/August 2000.

At the time of his death, he was the chairman of Centre for Telangana Studies, which is engaged in research and publication relating to problems of Telangana. He is the founder member of Telangana Aikya Vedika and was on its executive committee.

It was Jayashankar who offered lime juice to the BRS president when the latter broke his famous fast for Telangana in December 2009.

He used to say about Telangana people Etti kaina, Matti kaina manode undala meaning, for lighting the pyre or for farming, it should be our people.

=== Teaching career ===
Professor Jayashankar was Registrar of the then Central Institute of English and Foreign Languages (CIEFL) before being appointed Vice-chancellor of Kakatiya University in 1991.

He taught Economics and supervised research at the doctoral level.

He made in-depth studies on the problems emanating from regional disparities in the levels of development with special reference to A.P.

He has to his credit a large number of papers published in the areas of economic development and educational economics.

== Death ==
Jayashankar did not marry and remained a bachelor all his life.

He died on 21 June 2011, 11.15 AM after battling stomach cancer.

== Positions held ==
- Vice-Chancellor of Kakatiya University, Warangal (1991–94)
- Registrar of Central Institute of English & Foreign Languages (CIEFL), Hyderabad (1982–91)
- Registrar of Kakatiya University, Warangal (1979–81)
- Principal of CKM College, Warangal (1975–79)
- Board of Governors: Central Institute of English & Foreign Languages (CIEFL), Hyderabad
- Board of Governors: Regional Engineering College, Warangal
- Planning Board: Mahatma Gandhi University, Kottayam, Kerala
- Andhra Pradesh State Council of Higher Education
- Search Committee: for appointing the Vice-Chancellor of Central Institute of English & Foreign Languages (CIEFL), Hyderabad
- Several working groups constituted by the University Grants Commission
- Senate: Osmania University, Hyderabad
- Academic Council: Osmania University, Hyderabad
- Senate: Kakatiya University, Warangal
- Academic Council: Kakatiya University, Warangal
- Academic Senate: Kakatiya University, Warangal
- Governing Body: SLNS College, Bhongir (also was its chairman)
- Governing Body: Lal Bahadur College, Warangal
- Governing Body: Sardar patel College, Secunderabad
- Advisory Board: Life Insurance Corporation of India

Organizational:

- President, and also general secretary: Government College Teachers’ Association, A.P.
- General secretary: Telangana Government College Teachers’ Association
- Member of the National Executive: All India Federation of University and College Teachers’ Organisations
- Started Telangana Regional Teachers Union in May, 2000. (TRTU).

== Articles ==
- Unequal distribution of water resources between Telangana, Andhra and Rayalaseema

Books 1. తెలంగాణాలో ఏం జరుగుతోంది ? What is Happening in Telangana ? 2. తెలంగాణా రాష్ట్రం ఒక డిమాండ్ - Telangana Rashtram Oka Demand, written in Telugu Language, First Pblished by Mallepalli Laxmirajam Memorial Trsut in 2004 23. Economic Viability of Andhra and Telangana as Separate States, A special Report submitted to Justice Srikrishna Committee in 2010. Later after his death Telangana Vidyavantula Vedika Published the book in 2013 4. Kompelli Venkat Goud transcripted his Autobiography and Published " వొడవని ముచ్చట - Vodavani Muchchata" in Telugu language
