= Agricultural College, Bapatla =

Educational institution in India

Coordinates: 15.9002°N 80.4715°E

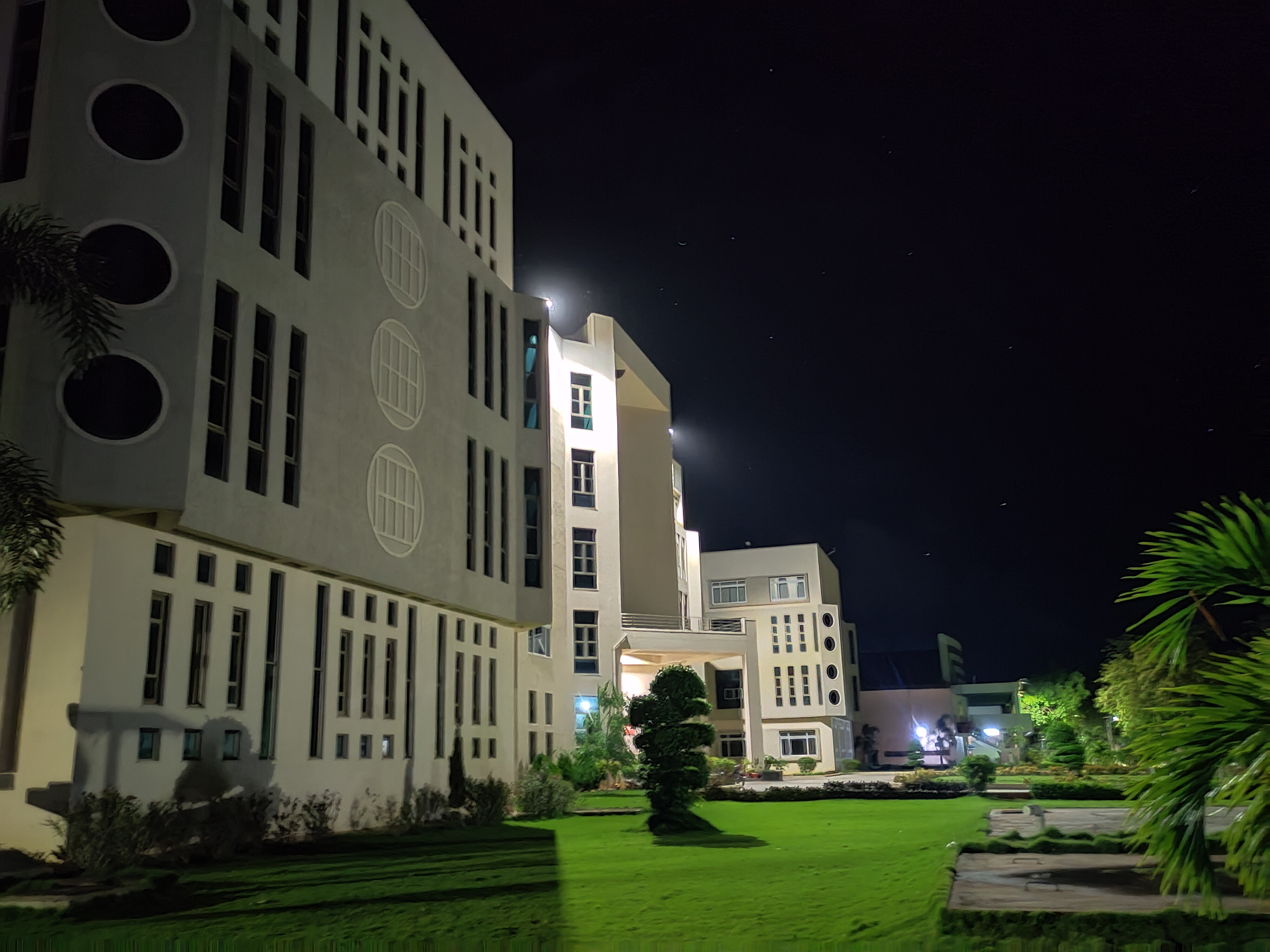
New Anex Building

The Agricultural College, Bapatla was founded on 11 July 1945 by the Government of Composite Madras State India. It is the oldest of the eight Agricultural Colleges that make up Acharya N G Ranga Agricultural University, Andhra Pradesh.

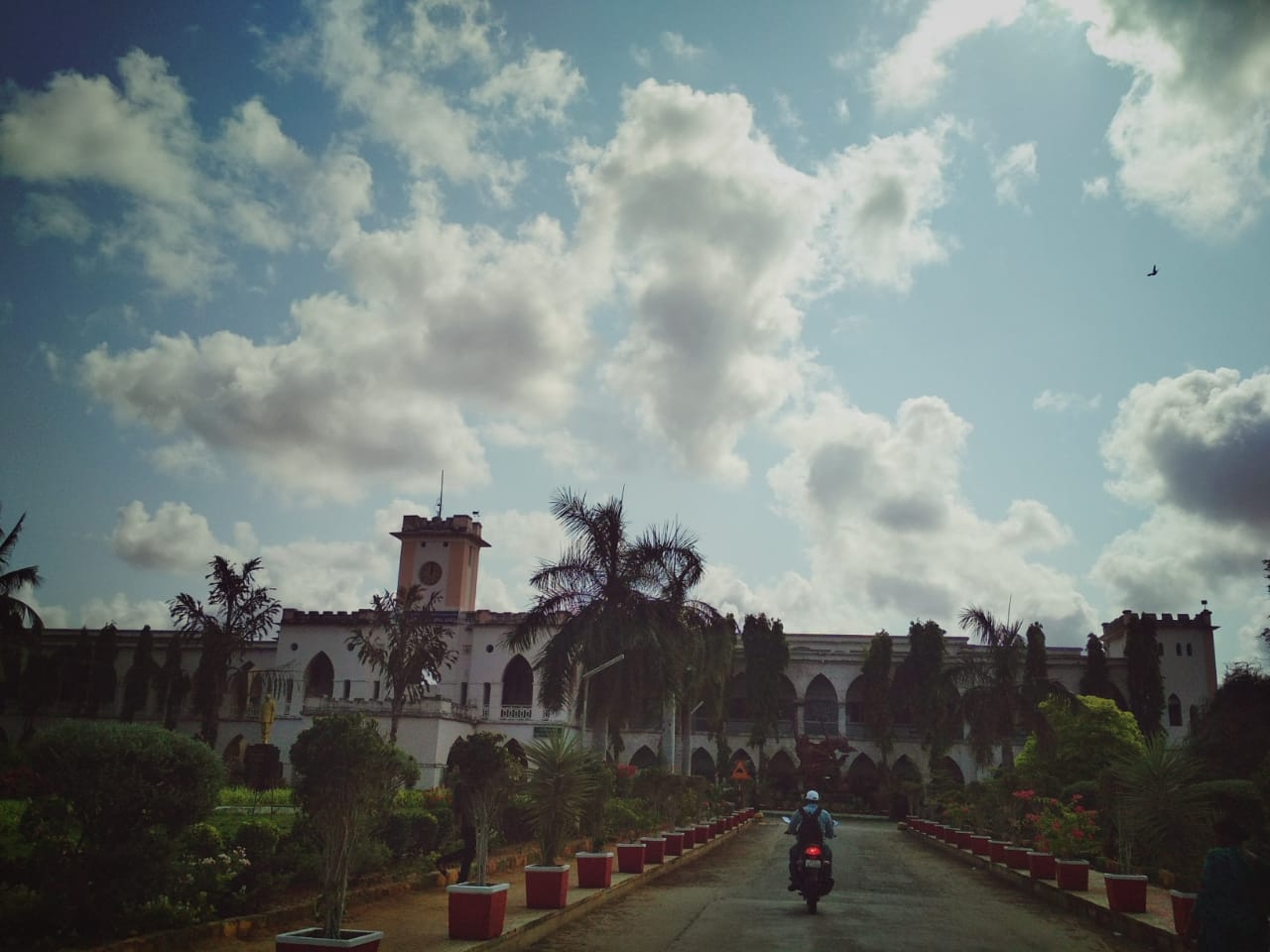
college entrance view

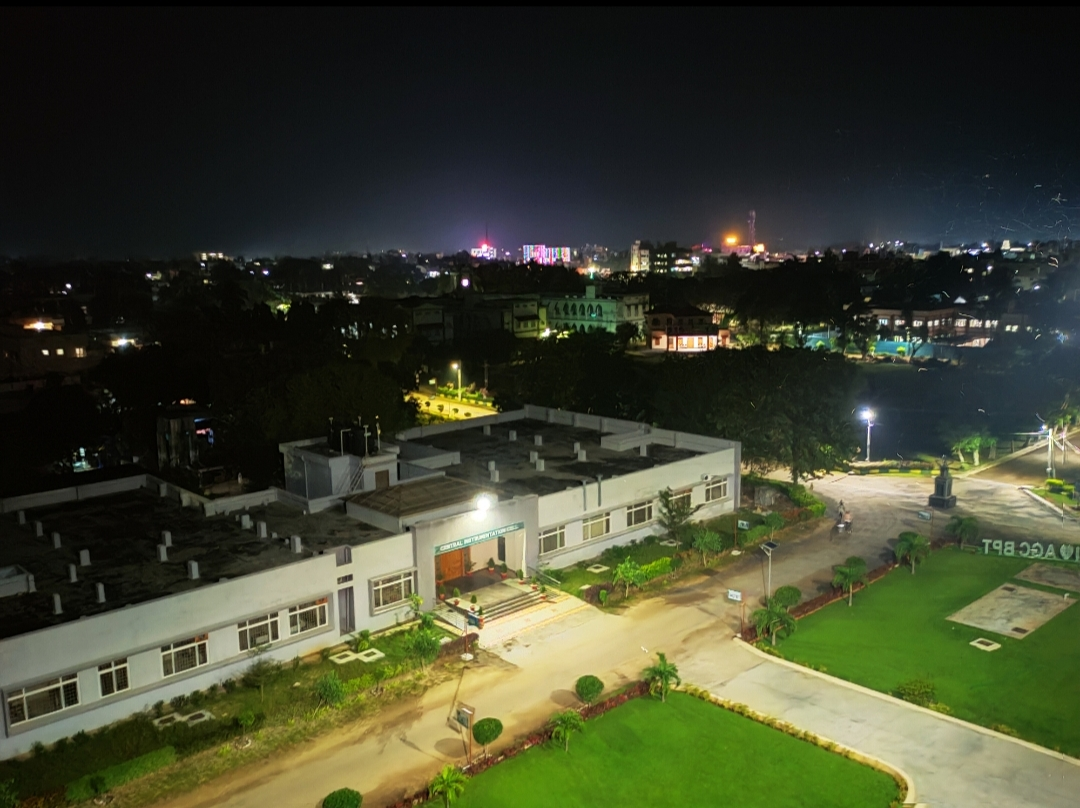
Top view of campus from anex

== History ==
Sri C R Srinivasa Iyengar was its first principal. The college was affiliated to the Andhra University in 1945. The first graduating class received their degree in 1948 from the Andhra University, Waltair. An area of 328 acres was acquired on the Bapatla – Guntur road in 1950.

The college was recognized to give a M.Sc (Ag) by research in 1951. In 1964 it became part of Andhra Pradesh Agricultural University, established with Sri O Pulla Reddy as first Vice-Chancellor. Post-graduate programmes were started in Genetics and Plant Breeding (1968), Entomology and Soil Science and Agricultural Chemistry (1970), Agricultural Economics (1976), Plant Physiology (1978), in Agronomy and Plant Pathology (1982). An Extension division was added in 1984. Ph.D programmes in Plant Pathology, Plant Physiology and Entomology began in 1993.

M.V.Reddy was Professor and Principal (1980–83)

In 1983, a 4-year B.Tech (Agril. Engineering) degree programme was started, which became an independent College of Agricultural Engineering in 1989; a College of Home Science was started in 1983.

Dr D.Lokanadha Reddy appointed as Associate Dean of Agricultural College bapatla on 1 September 2017.

Succession of Principals
- 1960–1967 – Dr. B. Appala Naidu,
- 1968–1970 – Sri P. Govinda Rao,
- 1970–1971 – Dr. A. Adivi Reddy,
- 1971–1975 – Dr. S. N. Rao,
- 1975–1978 – Dr. R. L. Narasimham,
- 1978 – Dr. S. Mahboob Ali,
- 1978–1980 – Dr. T. D. J. Nagabhushanam,
- 1980–1983 – Dr. M. V. Reddy,
- 1983–1984 – Dr. M. Sugunakar Reddy,
- 1984–1986 – Dr. K. A. Balasubramanian,
- 1986–1989 – Dr. A. Narayan,
- 1989– Dr. G. Madhusudana Rao

== Historical Contributions ==
The BPT 5204 rice variety was developed by the Andhra Pradesh Agricultural Research Station (ANGRAU) bapatla in the 1980s. It's also known as Samba Mahsuri. Features BPT 5204 is a medium-duration variety that takes around 130-140 days to mature. It has medium slender grains and excellent cooking qualities. It's suitable for all types of soil with irrigated conditions. It's non-lodging and non-shattering, non-dormant. It's resistant to bacterial blight. It's known for its high yield potential. Other details BPT 5204 is a highly popular rice variety among the farmers in South India and some parts of eastern Uttar Pradesh. It's also cultivated in Karnataka, Tamil Nadu, Odisha and Bihar. However, the variety is extremely susceptible to bacterial blight of rice and also susceptible to salinity causing significant yield loss.

The Agricultural Research Station (ARS) in Bapatla has released several rice varieties, including Sona Mahsuri, Bhavapuri Sannalu, Teja, and BPT 2841. Rice varieties released by the ARS in Bapatla Sona Mahsuri (BPT 3291): A medium-duration variety with fine grains and good cooking quality Bhavapuri Sannalu (BPT 2270): Released in 2010 Teja (BPT 2595): A non-lodging variety with medium slender grains and excellent cooking quality BPT 2841 (MTU7029/IRGC18145/MTU. 1081): A black pericarp colored genotype with medium slender grains and excellent cooking quality Other notable achievements of the ARS in Bapatla Released the BPT 2595 variety in 2019 through a mutation breeding program Released the BPT 3291 variety, which is moderately resistant to blast Released the BPT 2270 variety, which is one of the medium duration varieties Released the BPT 1235 variety, which is one of the short duration varieties

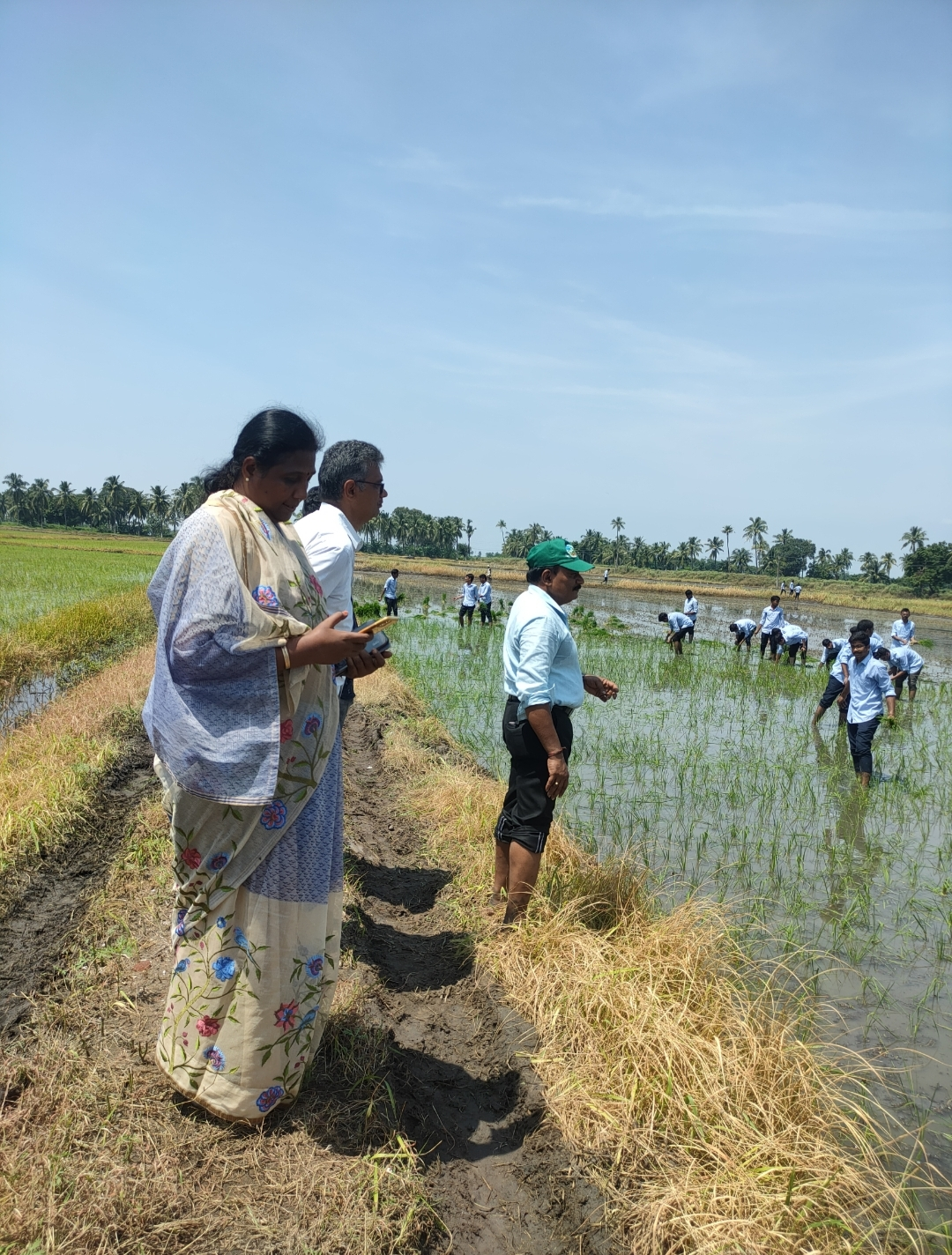
Field visits. AGCBPT

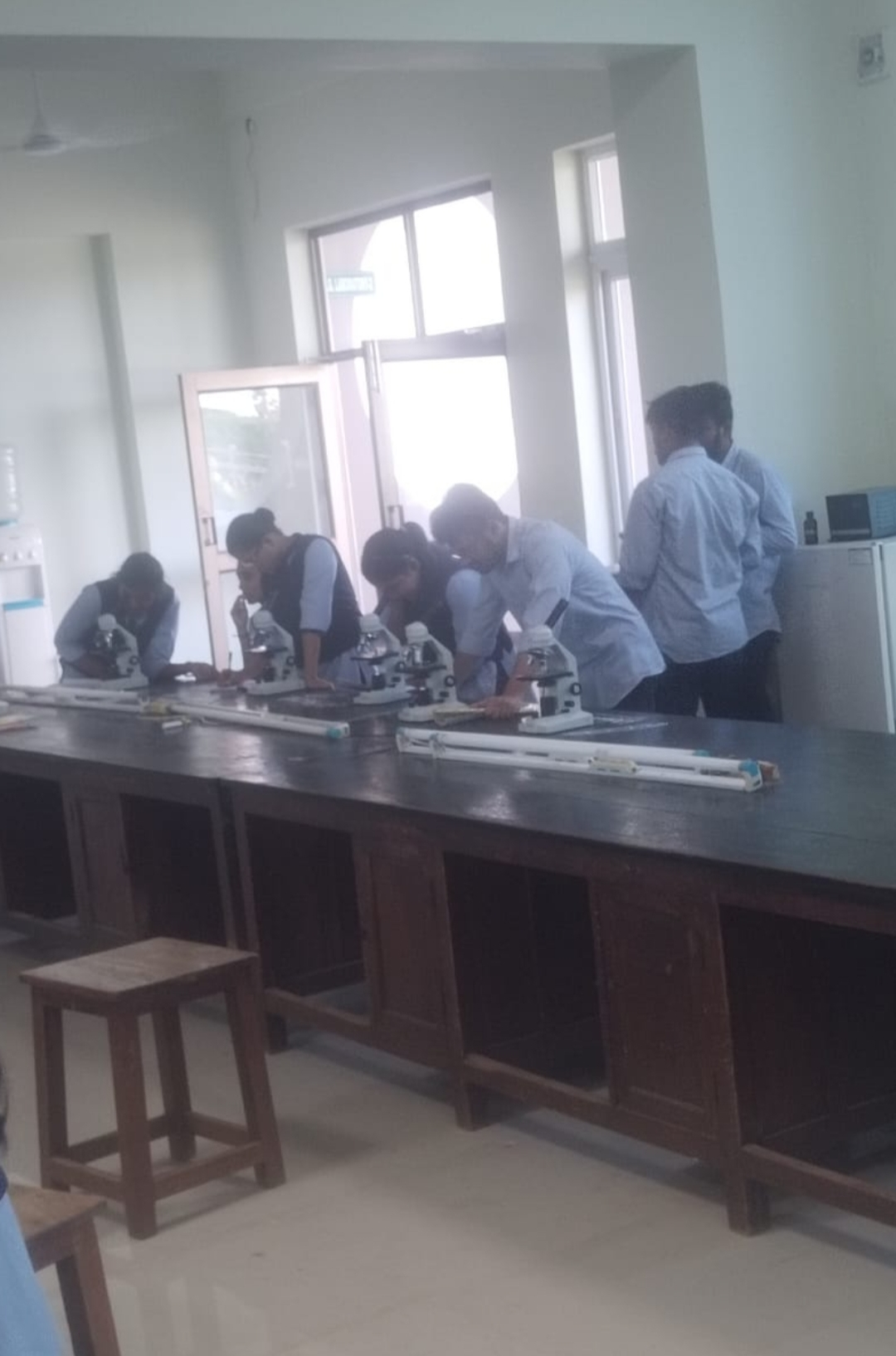
Students doing practicals

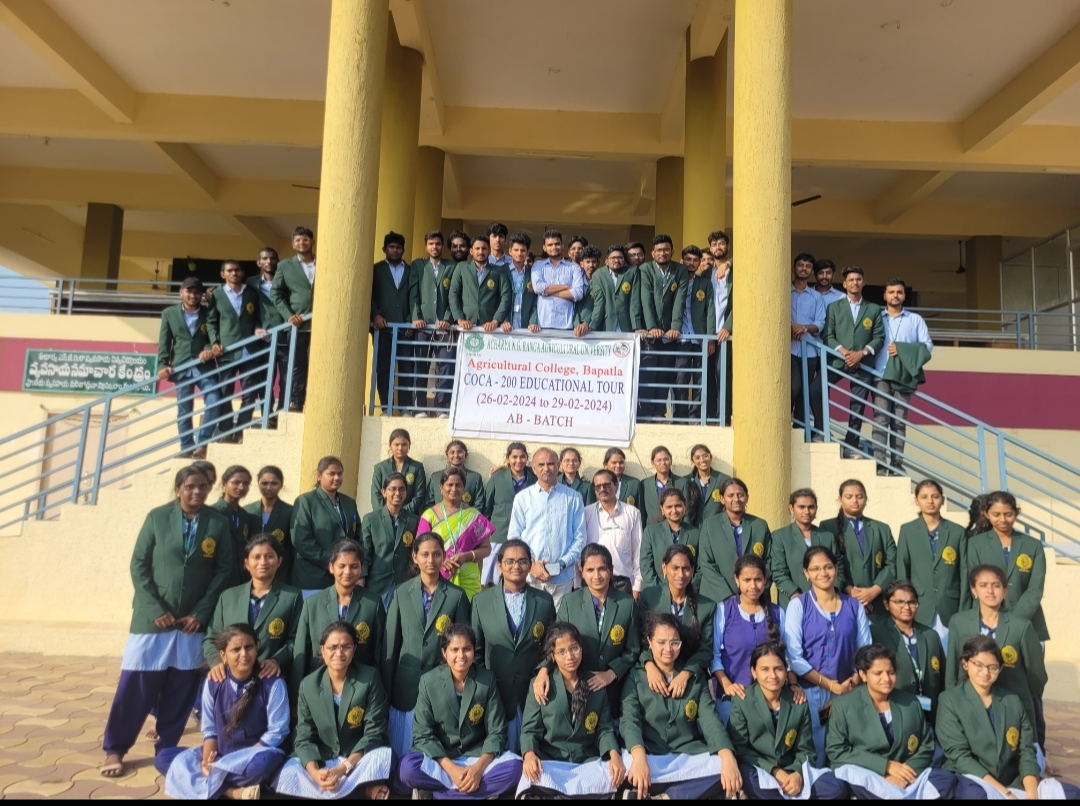
Guntur lam visit

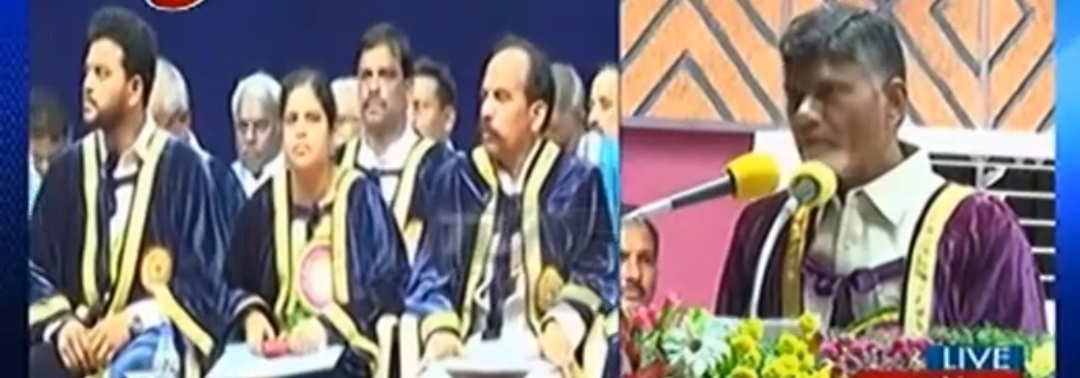
Cm Chandrababu naidu garu visit
