= 1990 Hyderabad riots =

Riots in India

- Part of religious violence in India
- Date: December 1990
- Location: Old City, Hyderabad, (then Andhra Pradesh)
- Caused by: Ayodhya dispute, Personal rivalries escalating into religious attacks
- Methods: Rioting

Casualties
- Deaths: 200-300
- Injuries: Thousands

The 1990 Hyderabad riots were a series of riots that occurred in Hyderabad of Telangana, the then Andhra Pradesh state of India in 1990. The riots left about 200–300 people dead and thousands injured.

== Background ==
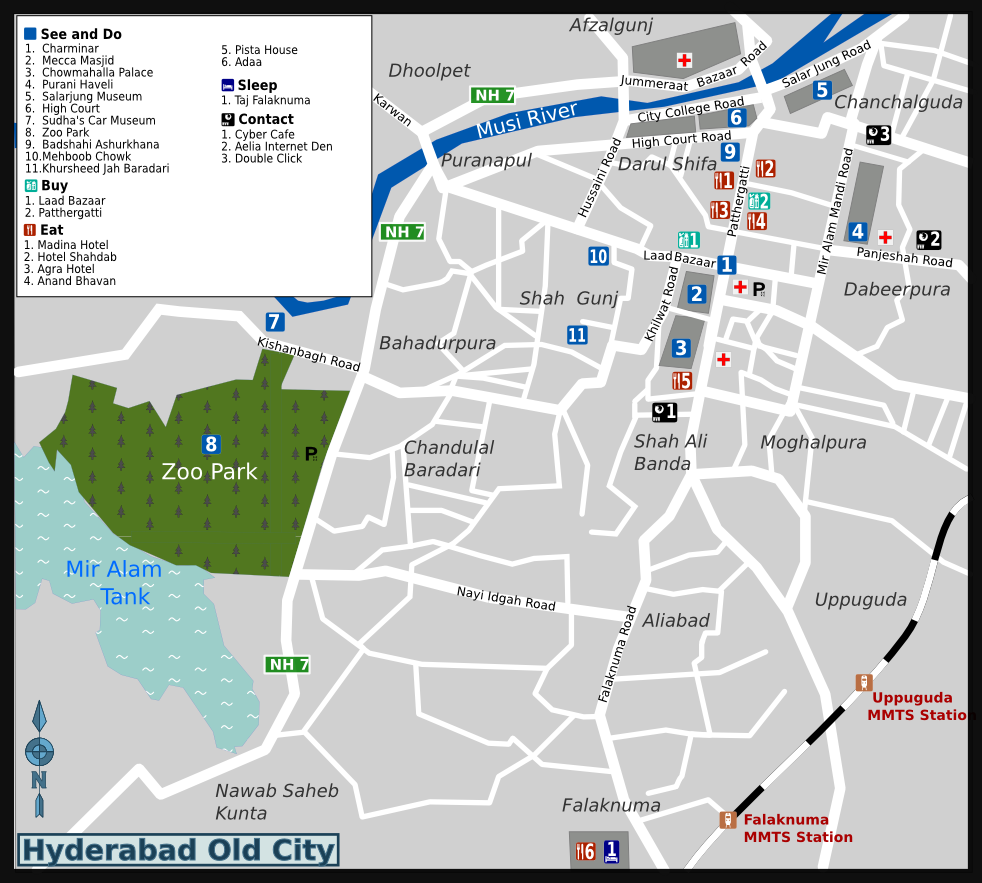
Old City Hyderabad

Hyderabad has a long history of Hindu-Muslim violence, with the previous major riot taking place in 1984. The roots of the 1990 riots lay in the Ayodhya dispute, which is centered on Uttar Pradesh, a different state. Hindu activists have long alleged that the Babri mosque in Ayodhya was constructed after Muslims demolished a temple at the site. In November 1990, when a crowd of Hindu activists tried to demolish the mosque, the police fired on them, resulting in several deaths. Since then, the tension between Hyderabadi Hindus and Muslims had been rising.

== Causes ==
The riots began with the killing of Sardar, a Muslim auto-rickshaw driver, by two Hindus. The death was actually the result of a land dispute unrelated to religious matters. But in light of the Babri mosque controversy, people saw it as a Hindu-Muslim conflict. In response to Sardar's killing, Muslims killed four Hindus in different parts of the walled city. Bharatiya Janata Party workers then attacked Majid Khan, an influential Muslim leader in the Sabzi Mandi area. As false rumors about his death spread, Muslim mobs came out in open, followed by the Hindu mobs, and the violence spread.

== The riots ==
During 8–10 December 1990, 64 people were killed, stabbed or shot within 3 days. By 10 December, the Indian Army had taken control of the old city of Hyderabad, and more than 350 people had been detained in connection with the riots. The violence lasted for ten weeks, and resulted in 200 to 300 deaths; thousands were injured.

On 8 December, police constable Mohammed Abdul Qadeer shot his superior N. Sattaiah, the South Zone Assistant Commissioner of Police. Qadeer alleged that Sattiah was selectively targeting a particular community during police action against the rioters. He surrendered, and was sentenced for life. His subsequent petitions for release were refused, because of opposition by Sattaiah's family and police officials, but he was released on parole several times during periods of illness, with the support of Majlis-e-Ittehadul Muslimeen legislators. He was finally released in 2016, and died a year later.

== Aftermath ==
Not a single rioter was arrested. Chief Minister Marri Chenna Reddy, a member of the Indian National Congress, claimed that the riot had been engineered by his rivals in his own party, who wanted to oust him.
