= Mohammed Abdul Qadeer =

Indian police constable and murderer

Abdul Qadeer was a police constable from Hyderabad, Telangana, India, who was given a life sentence after being convicted of killing another police officer ACP Sattaiah during the Babri Masjid demolition riots in 1992. As reported in Hindustan Times in 2017, "He had shot dead Assistant Commissioner of Police Sattaiah at Chhatrinaka police station of the old city from his service weapon, during the peak of communal riots, in which 200 people were killed. The incident took place on 8 December 1990. Two years later, a court had found Abdul Qadeer guilty of murder and sentenced him to life imprisonment."

Many Muslim organisations appealed for his release on health grounds – one of his legs had been amputated during his imprisonment as a consequence of diabetes – but their pleas were initially rejected by various governments. He was finally released from jail on parole on 30 March 2016. He died due to ill-health on 15 September 2017, and his funeral was prayed at Makkah Masjid of Hyderabad.
