= Ghulam Mohammed (judge) =

Indian judge (1950–2017)

Ghulam Mohammed (6 April 1950 – 23 November 2017) was an Indian judge. He served as a judge of the Hyderabad High Court from 1999 to 2012, serving as acting chief justice of that high court in 2011. He died at the age of 67.

== Early life and education ==
He was born in Hyderabad. He completed his bachelor's degree in science from the Osmania University in 1974. He then obtained bachelor's and master's degrees in law from the same university.

== Career ==
He was appointed judge of the Hyderabad High Court in 1999, and retired in 2012.

On the retirement of Chief Justice Nisar Ahmed Kakru, Ghulam, as the senior-most judge of the high court, was appointed the acting Chief Justice. He assumed office on 26 October 2011. He vacated the office on 14 November 2011, and was succeeded by Madan Lokur.

== Death and burial ==
He died due to cardiac arrest on 23 November 2017 at his Begumpet residence. He was buried at the Moosa Qadri burial ground in Old City.
