= Andhra Vidyalaya College =

College in Hyderabad, India

- Type: Educational Institution
- Established: 1944; 82 years ago
- Affiliations: Osmania University
- Principal: Dr. Ch.Rajalingam
- Undergraduates: ~4,000 per year
- Location: Gagan Mahal, Hyderabad – 500029, Hyderabad, Telangana, India; 17.4093431°N 78.480534°E
- Campus: Urban
- Website: www.avcollege.in
- Location in Hyderabad Andhra Vidyalaya College (Telangana) Andhra Vidyalaya College (India)

Andhra Vidyalaya College of Arts, Science and Commerce, popularly known as Andhra Vidyalaya College, is an educational institution located in Hyderabad, India. The college offers undergraduate graduate and post graduate courses. The college is located on a 7.13-acre (2.89 ha) campus and is widely known for its emphasis on sports and games. It is accredited with A grade by NAAC.

== History ==
Andhra Vidyalaya Education Society one of the oldest and pioneer educational society in the erstwhile Nizam State of Hyderabad, was started in 1944 at Kattelamandi (now Gagan Mahal) as a small school by its founder was Konda Venkata Ranga Reddy, former Deputy Chief Minister of Andhra Pradesh.The A.V. College was established in 1968 as a composite college offering plus two and UG courses. It grew to occupy the status of a multidimensional institution with PG courses. The PG courses were first offered in the year 1991. K.V. Ranga Reddy Law College was set up in the same year.

== Departments ==
- Psychology department
- Biotechnology department
- Business Administration department
- Chemistry department
- Computer Science department
- Mathematics department
- Physics department
- Telugu department
- zoology department
- botany department

== Courses ==
- Bachelor of Arts (B.A.)
- Bachelor of Commerce (B.Com.)
- Bachelor of Science (B.Sc.)
- Master of Arts (M.A.)
- Master of Business Administration (M.B.A.)
- Master of Commerce (M.Com.)
- Master of Computer Applications (M.C.A.)
- Master of Science (M.Sc.)

== Institutions ==
- Degree College
- Post-graduation college
- K.V. Ranga Reddy Law College

== Facilities ==
=== Library ===
The Postgraduate library is established in the year 1991 and hosts in Suravaram Pratapa Reddy Library Building. It is an independent building with an area of 4,500 Sft. spread over three floors. The ground floor is accommodating Undergraduate library, The first floor is accommodating Reference Section and Reading Room and the second floor is accommodating Library Book stacks. The library has a collection of 23,800 books in Management, Computers, Mathematics, Physics, Chemistry Commerce, Biotechnology and Telugu studies. The library subscribes to more than 120 Journals and periodicals popular newspapers. The library activities are fully automated. There is a common reading room with a seating capacity of more than 100 students.

=== Sports and games ===
Sports are a special feature of the college with excellent facilities. The spacious ground is advantage to the students and are encouraged to play various indoor and outdoor games. Many students seek admission in this institution for this reason.

== Notable alumni ==
- Revanth Reddy Chief Minsister of Telangana
- Pullela Gopichand, badminton coach India
- Subhash Reddy, Honb'l Justice High Court of Andhra Pradesh

== See also ==
- Education in India
- Literacy in India
- List of institutions of higher education in Telangana
