= Evangelical Church of India =

The Evangelical Church of India (ECI) is an Episcopal Christian denomination in India. It operates the Allahabad Bible Seminary in Allahabad, the Calcutta Bible Seminary in Kolkata and the Madras Theological Seminary and College in Chennai. It came into existence due to the activity of the Oriental Missionary Society. The church has more than 100,000 members. Its core vision is "One Lakh Churches, One Crore Believers" in 2056.

== See also ==
- Christianity in India
