= Jetty (disambiguation) =

A jetty may be a variety of structures employed in river, dock, and maritime works. Jetty may also refer to:

== Architecture and construction ==
- Jetty, a term for an overhang (architecture) in the American colonial architecture
- Jettying, a building technique used in medieval timber-frame buildings

== Other uses ==
- Jetty (podcast network), a podcast network from Al Jazeera Media Network
- Jetty (web server), an HTTP server and servlet container written in Java
- Jetty, a film by Sam Fleischner with a soundtrack by Animal Collective
