= Sardar Ali Khan (justice) =

Indian judge

Justice Sardar Ali Khan
- Born: 5 May 1930
- Died: 8 November 2012 (aged 82); Hyderabad, India
- Education: Osmania University
- Occupation: Judge

Justice Sardar Ali Khan (5 May 1930 – 8 November 2012) was a former Chief Justice of Andhra Pradesh. He held various positions in judiciary.

== Early life ==
He was born in Hyderabad State to Mohammed Amir Ali Khan, a subedar (governor) in the court of the last Nizamof Hyderabad. He topped the Madras University's Intermediate Examination in 1948. He obtained his BA and LL.B at Osmania University.

== Career ==
He was also Chairman of National Commission for Minorities and President of the Andhra Pradesh State Legal Aid & Advisory Board. He served as President of Andhra Pradesh Judicial Academy from 1991 to 1992, He was Dean of the Faculty of Law at Osmania University from 1984 to 1991 and President of the Board of Management at Nizam College from 1994 to 1996.

== Death ==
He died on 8 November 2012, aged 82.

== Personal life ==
He was married and has a son and a four daughters.
