= Chaitanya Bharathi Institute of Technology =

Engineering college in Gandipet, Telangana, India

- Motto: Swayam Tejaswin Bhava
- Type: Private
- Established: 1979
- Affiliations: Osmania University
- Principal: Prof. C. V. Narasimhulu
- Location: Hyderabad, Telangana, India; 17°23′31″N 78°19′10″E
- Campus: Urban, 90 acres (0.36 km^{2}) of land
- Website: www.cbit.ac.in

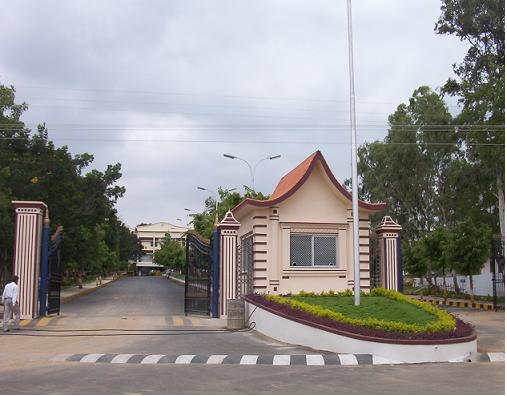
Main entrance of Chaitanya Bharathi Institute of Technology

Chaitanya Bharathi Institute of Technology (CBIT) is a private engineering college located in Gandipet, near Financial District, Hyderabad, Telangana, India. The college is affiliated to Osmania University and is accredited by the National Board of Accreditation. The institute received an autonomous status in 2013.

== History ==
CBIT established in 1979 is one of the early private engineering colleges in India.

=== Rankings ===
University rankings

Engineering – India
- NIRF (2023): 151-200

== Student life ==
=== Events ===
==== TEDxCBIT ====
The students of CBIT organize the independent TED event as TEDxCBIT. The event is completely organized by the students of CBIT and has been organized twice since 2017, each with a different theme.

List of TEDxCBIT events
Year	Date	Theme
2018	7 October	"Making Space"
2017	7 January	"Diversity. Novelty. Erudition."

CBIT MUN

The students of CBIT have organized a Model United Nations conference every year since 2009

== Notable alumni ==
- Y. S. Chowdary, elected member of the Member of Parliament (Rajya Sabha) in 2010.
- J. D. Chakravarthy, film actor in the Telugu film industry – 1986.
- Komatireddy Venkat Reddy, politician.
- Neeraj Ghaywan, Film Director in Bollywood
- Ravi Varma, film actor in the Telugu film industry – 1997.
