= Cellular and Molecular Life Sciences =

- Discipline: Life science
- Language: English
- Edited by: Klaus Eichmann

Publication details
- History: 1945-present
- Publisher: Springer Science+Business Media
- Frequency: Monthly
- Impact factor: 9.261 (2020)

Standard abbreviations
- ISO 4: Cell. Mol. Life Sci.

Indexing
- CODEN: CMLSFI
- ISSN: 1420-682X (print); 1420-9071 (web)
- LCCN: 97647616
- OCLC no.: 610389347
- Experientia
- ISSN: 0014-4754

Links
- Journal homepage; Online archive

Cellular and Molecular Life Sciences is a peer-reviewed scientific journal covering cellular and molecular life sciences. It was established in 1945 as Experientia, obtaining its current name in 1994. The Editors-in-chief are Roberto Bruzzone and Jean Leon Thomas. According to the Journal Citation Reports, the journal has a 2020 impact factor of 9.261.
