= D. C. Reddy =

Professor D. C. Reddy, is an Electronics and Bio Medical engineering professor was Vice Chancellor of Osmania University, Hyderabad, Andhra Pradesh, India. He was the 19th vice-chancellor, and served as vice-chancellor from 1999 to 2002; he was preceded by Prof. V. Ramakistayya (1996–1999), and followed by Prof. J. Anantha Swamy (2002–2004)
