= Bal Dattatreya Tilak =

Indian chemical engineer (1918–1999)

- Born: 26 September 1918; Karanja, Wardha
- Died: 25 May 1999 (aged 80)
- Known for: National Chemical Laboratory

Bal Dattatreya Tilak (26 September 1918 – 25 May 1999) was an Indian chemical engineer and a director of the National Chemical Laboratory.

He was awarded the Padma Bhushan, the third-highest civilian honour of the Government of India, in 1972.
