= Saifabad =

- neighbourhood
- Location in Telangana, India Saifabad (Telangana) Saifabad (India)
- Coordinates: 17.366°N 78.476°E
- Country: India
- State: Telangana
- District: Hyderabad
- Metro: Hyderabad

Government
  - Body: GHMC

Languages
  - Official: Telugu, Urdu
- Time zone: UTC+5:30 (IST)
- PIN: 500 029
- Vehicle registration: TS
- Lok Sabha constituency: Secunderabad
- Vidhan Sabha constituency: Khairtabad
- Planning agency: GHMC
- Website: telangana.gov.in

Saifabad is one of the major suburbs in Hyderabad, Telangana, India.

The Ravindra Bharathi auditorium, named after Rabindranath Tagore, is located here.

== Transport ==
TSRTC runs the buses to this suburb, connecting it to all parts of the city. The closest MMTS train station is at Lakdi ka Pul
