= Kailasa Venkata Ramiah =

Indian educationist

Prof. K. Venkata Ramiah
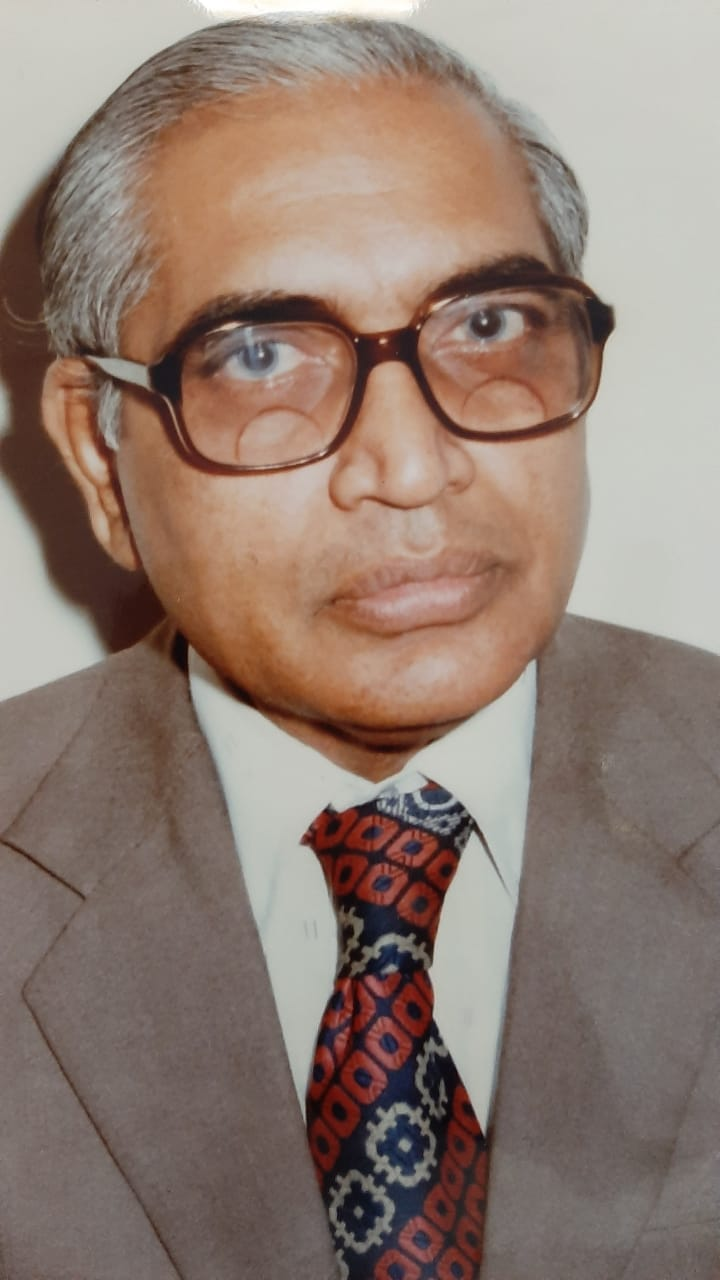

Vice Chancellor of Kakatiya University
- In office 20 Aug 1976 – 19 Aug 1979

Member UPSC
- In office 1981–1987

Kailasa Venkata Ramiah (20 October 1926 – 17 December 1994) was an educationist from Andhra Pradesh, India. He was born in Pegallapadu village of Khammam district. He stood first-in-first in both B.Sc and M.Sc from Osmania University and grew to head the Physics Department of Osmania University. He was recipient of the Sir Akbar Hyderi Gold medal and several awards during his career both as student and later as an academician. He finished his PhD in record time and later his research was in quantum mechanics and Raman effect. He published about 100 papers in both national and international journals. He served to become the first Vice-Chancellor of Kakatiya University (1976–79). He founded the University from its inception. It was his vision and efforts that led to the development of Kakatiya University in a short period of time.

He was the first person from the present Telangana to be the member of Union Public Service Commission during the period 1981-87. He was one of the pioneers in UPSC to adopt computers in big way, marking a big milestone in history of UPSC. He was also instrumental in DRDO recruitment in a big way during the 1980s, when it was under the purview of the UPSC. He acted as UPSC chairman on several occasions during his tenure as UPSC member. He served on Satish Chandra panel for review on UPSC (Civil Services) selection process.

== Positions held ==
1) Lecturer, Physics, Nizam College

2) Principal, Arts & Science college, Warangal

3) First Principal and Special Officer, P.G. Centre, Warangal

4) Head, Physics Department, Osmania University, Hyderabad

5) Director, P.G. Centre, Warangal

6) First Vice-Chancellor, Kakatiya University, Warangal

7) Member, Union Public Service Commission, New Delhi

== Achievements and governing bodies ==
1) Fellow of AP Akademy of Sciences

2) Editorial board member of Indian Journal of Physics

3) Best Teachers AP Award

4) Syndicate Member Osmania University

5) Governing Body, Vasavi College of Engineering, Hyderabad

6) Founder board member of Education Consultants of India Ltd.

7) Expert member of various committees of University Grants Commission of India

8) Governing Body of Mahbub College, Secunderabad

9) President, Lions Club of Secunderabad
