= Bible translations into Telugu =

The first translation was by Rev. Benjamin Schulz who translated parts of Bible in the early part of 18th century. The manuscripts were sent to Germany for printing but were not printed. The main translation into the Telugu language was Lyman Jewett's version of the 1880s.

John 3:16 దేవుడు లోకమును ఎంతో ప్రేమించెను. కాగా ఆయన తన అద్వితీయ కుమారునిగా పుట్టిన వానియందు విశ్వాసముంచు ప్రతివాడును నశింపక నిత్యజీవము పొందునట్లు ఆయనను అనుగ్రహించెను

This is today known as the "Telugu Bible OV" (పరిశుద్ధ గ్రంథము), published by the Bible Society of India Andhra Pradesh Auxiliary in Hyderabad.

In collaboration with Church centric bible translation, Free Bibles India has published a Telugu translation online.

In 2019, the New World Translation of the Holy Scriptures was released by Jehovah's Witnesses as a complete Bible translation in Telugu. The full Bible was published online (also offline in PDF format) with mobile versions released through JW Library application in App stores.
