= Kakatiya University =

Public university in Warangal, Telangana, India

- Motto: Marching Towards Academic Excellence
- Type: Public
- Established: 19 August 1976; 49 years ago
- Affiliations: UGC
- Chancellor: Governor of Telangana
- Vice-Chancellor: K. Pratap Reddy
- Location: Hanumakonda district, Telangana, India; 18°1′41.08″N 79°33′6.89″E
- Campus: Urban
- Website: www.kakatiya.ac.in

Kakatiya University is a public university located in Hanumakonda district in the Indian state of Telangana. It was most recently accredited with an "A+" Grade by the National Assessment and Accreditation Council of India in the month of June 2023. The university offers about 120 programs at undergraduate and postgraduate levels in the faculties of arts, science, commerce and business management, social sciences, education, engineering and pharmaceutical sciences with constituent and affiliated colleges spread over 12 districts of Telangana. The faculties include 248 teaching staff and 622 non-teaching staff.

== Academics ==
The university has a network of eleven constituent colleges with twenty-eight departments. During 2011-2012, enrollment of students for under-graduate programs was around 90,000 in the 2004-2005 school year, according to the university's own website, while it was 8,000 for post-graduate courses. About 850 research scholars are registered for PhD programs in different departments.

For the first time in Telangana, postgraduate in-service science courses for teachers and government employees, M.L.I.Sc and MCJ, diploma in mimicry, certificate course in communication skills in English, M.Sc. (Environmental Science), B.Tech. and M.Sc. (Psychology) have been made available.

The university also promotes individual and collective research by faculty and scholars. On 20 March 2018, UGC granted autonomy to 21 state universities including Kakatiya University. Many Endowment Lectures have been instituted at the University where scholars present papers. One such endowment lecture is that of Pilli Alfred James annual endowment lectures which has seen public administrators take a stand on new issues in their discipline.

== Rankings ==
The university was ranked 88th in India by the NIRF (National Institutional Ranking Framework) in the pharmacy ranking in 2024.

University rankings

Pharmacy – India
- NIRF (2024): 88

== Vice Chancellors ==
Name of VC	Tenure from	Tenure to
K. Venkata Ramiah	20 Aug 1976	19 Aug 1979
Jafar Nizam	20 Aug 1979	19 Aug 1982
T. Vasudev	20 Aug 1982	18 Aug 1988
Jafar Nizam	26 Oct 1988	25 Oct 1991
K. Jayashankar	11 Dec 1991	09 Dec 1995
Y. Vaikuntham	21 Jan 1995	19 Jan 1998
Vidyavati	6 May 1998	5 May 2001
Chandrakant Kokate	10 Jan 2001	27 Sep 2004
V. Gopal Reddy	11 Oct 2004	10 Oct 2007
N. Linga Murthy	12 Nov 2007	10 Dec 2010
B. Venkat Rathnam	18 May 2011	17 May 2014
R. Sayanna	25 July 2016	2019
B. Janardhan Reddy (in-charge)	2019	2020
Tatikonda Ramesh	2021	2022
Vakati Karuna, IAS (in-charge)	2023	2025
K. Pratap Reddy	2025	Incumbent

== Notable alumni ==
- T. Harish Rao, politician
- V. Ramgopal Rao, B.Tech 1986, former director of IIT Delhi
- Venu Udugula, film director in Telugu cinema
