= T. D. J. Nagabhushanam =

Indian economist

- Born: February 17, 1928
- Died: September 5, 2016 (aged 88); Hyderabad, India
- Resting place: Christian Cemetery, Narayanguda, Hyderabad
- Other name: Thathapudi David Jesse Nagabhushanam
- Citizenship: Indian
- Education: B. Sc. (Andhra), M. Sc. (Andhra), Ph.D. (IARI)
- Alma mater: Andhra University, Waltair, Indian Agricultural Research Institute, New Delhi
- Known for: Teaching
- Awards: Andhra Pradesh State Best Teacher Award 1986-1987
- Scientific career
- Fields: Agriculture economics
- Workplaces: Bapatla (Andhra Pradesh) and Hyderabad (Telangana)
- Theses: A Study of the Economic and Social condition in Guntur District (1958); Capital resource productivity and credit limits on farm firms in Krishna and Guntur districts of Andhra Pradesh (1970)
- Doctoral advisor: Dr. K. Kanungo, Ph.D. (Iowa)

T. D. J. Nagabhushanam (1928 - 2016) was an Agricultural Economist associated initially with the Andhra University in the 1950s followed by the Andhra Pradesh Agricultural University (APAU) since the 1960s in Bapatla and Hyderabad respectively. Nagabhushanam first taught at the Agricultural College, Bapatla, which was then an affiliated entity of the Andhra University until it became a constituent College of the APAU in 1964. After nearly three decades of teaching in Bapatla, Nagabhushanam became the Principal during the 1980s after which he was made Dean of Agricultural economics and was notable for his research articles that were written over a period of nearly five decades beginning with the 1950s.

== Education and career ==
Nagabhushanam pursued studies in sciences specialising in Agriculture at the Andhra University during the 1950s where his postgraduate research was entitled A Study of the Economic and Social condition in Guntur District and joined the Agricultural College, Bapatla on 4 June 1951 as Assistant Lecturer in Agricultural Economics and rose on to become a professor, Principal and finally Dean of Agricultural Economics at the Andhra Pradesh Agricultural University. In addition to his teaching and administrative responsibilities at the university that included thesis supervision, Nagabhushanam had a flair for scientific research and contributed articles and was also a book reviewer in The Indian Journal of Agricultural Economics and delivered a guest lecture on Methodical Improvements in Agricultural Research in Economics at the University of Agricultural Sciences, Bangalore in 1981.

During the 1960s, Nagabhushanam was a Lieutenant in the National Cadet Corps. He was also a member of the Indian Society of Agricultural Economics and was also elected to its executive committee in the year 1979.

== Articles published ==
- Economic Condition of Fisher folk of Andhra Coast (with I. V. Parthasarathy and K. Padmanabha Rao). New Delhi: Rural India. 19. 1956.
- Betel leaf production and marketing in Guntur District. Bapatla: Andhra Agricultural Journal. 3. 1956.
- Mechanics of rationality in fixing minimum prices for tobacco (with Mohammed Hassan). Rajahmundry: Tobacco Research. 7 (1). 1981.
- Resource Management of Inland Fish Breeding-cum-Rearing Farms in Andhra Pradesh (with D. V. Subba Rao). New Delhi: Indian Journal of Agricultural Economics. 40 (4). 1985.
- Supply Response of Major Oil seed Crops in different regions of Andhra Pradesh (with Subba Rama Raju). New Delhi: Agricultural Situation in India. XLI (9). December 1986.
- Economics of size in sericulture industry in Chittoor district, Andhra Pradesh (with Neelakanta Sastry, T. V. Chandra Reddy). Bangalore: Indian Silk. 26 (2). 1987.
- Impact of new agricultural technology on farm incomes of rice farming in East Godavari district of Andhra Pradesh (with K. Hemachandrudu). New Delhi: Agricultural Situation in India. 41 (12). 1987. OCLC 17211136.
- Yield gap and constraints analysis in groundnut production in Warangal District of Andhra Pradesh (with G. P. Sunandini and J. Krishnaiah). Hyderabad: Journal of Oil Seeds Research. 5 (2). 1988.
- Performance of Markfed, Karnataka – An Economic Analysis (with H. G. Shankaramurthy). New Delhi: Indian Cooperative Review. 36. October 1990.
- Performance of the Markfed, Karnataka – Factor Analysis Approach (with H. G. Shankaramurthy and K. C. Hiremath). Bombay: Indian Journal of Agricultural Economics. 45 (4). Oct-Dec, 1990.
- Sustainable Agriculture, its problems and prospects (with Jetti Oliver). New Delhi: Voluntary Health Association of India. 1992.
- Rural Development in Andhra Pradesh (with T. D. S. Kumar). New Delhi: Indian Institute of Rural Management. 1993.

== Honorary initiatives ==
As a reader of the Telugu Bible, Nagabhushanam was also involved in the work of the Bible Societies and was a fund-raiser and member of the Bible Society of India Andhra Pradesh Auxiliary and subsequently in the 1990s, during the tenures of the Auxiliary Secretaries led by the Baptist Priest Lella Prakasam, CBCNC followed by the Old Testament Scholar, G. Babu Rao, CBCNC, he was elevated to the position of a Committee Member and Vice-president of the Auxiliary which was then housed at the Bible House in Secunderabad.

Academic offices
| Preceded by S. Mahboob Ali; 1978 | Principal, Agricultural College, Bapatla (Andhra Pradesh); 1978-1980 | Succeeded by M. V. Reddy; 1980-1983 |
Awards
| Preceded by B. Venkateswara Rao & M. Raj Reddy | Andhra Pradesh State Best Teacher Award; 1986-1987 | Succeeded by P. Varadarajulu & K. Chittemma Rao |
