= Santara dynasty =

Medieval ruling dynasty of Karnataka, India

Santara Dynasty
- 7th century–18th century
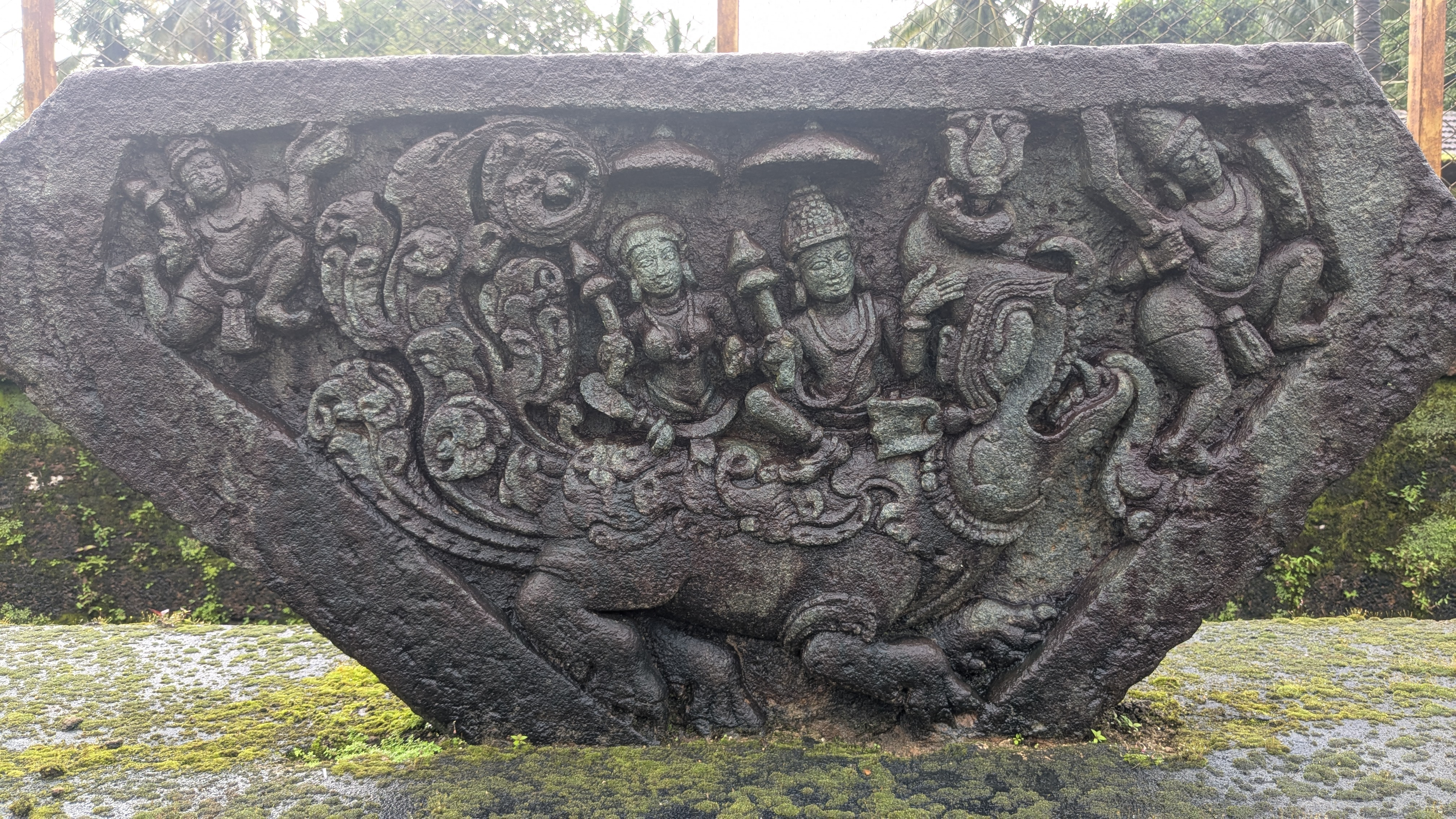
- Santara Dynasty of Karnataka
- Capital: Humcha & Kalasa
- Religion: Jainism
- Government: Monarchy
- History
  - Established: 7th century
  - Disestablished: 18th century
Succeeded by
Nayakas of Keladi
- Today part of: Karnataka

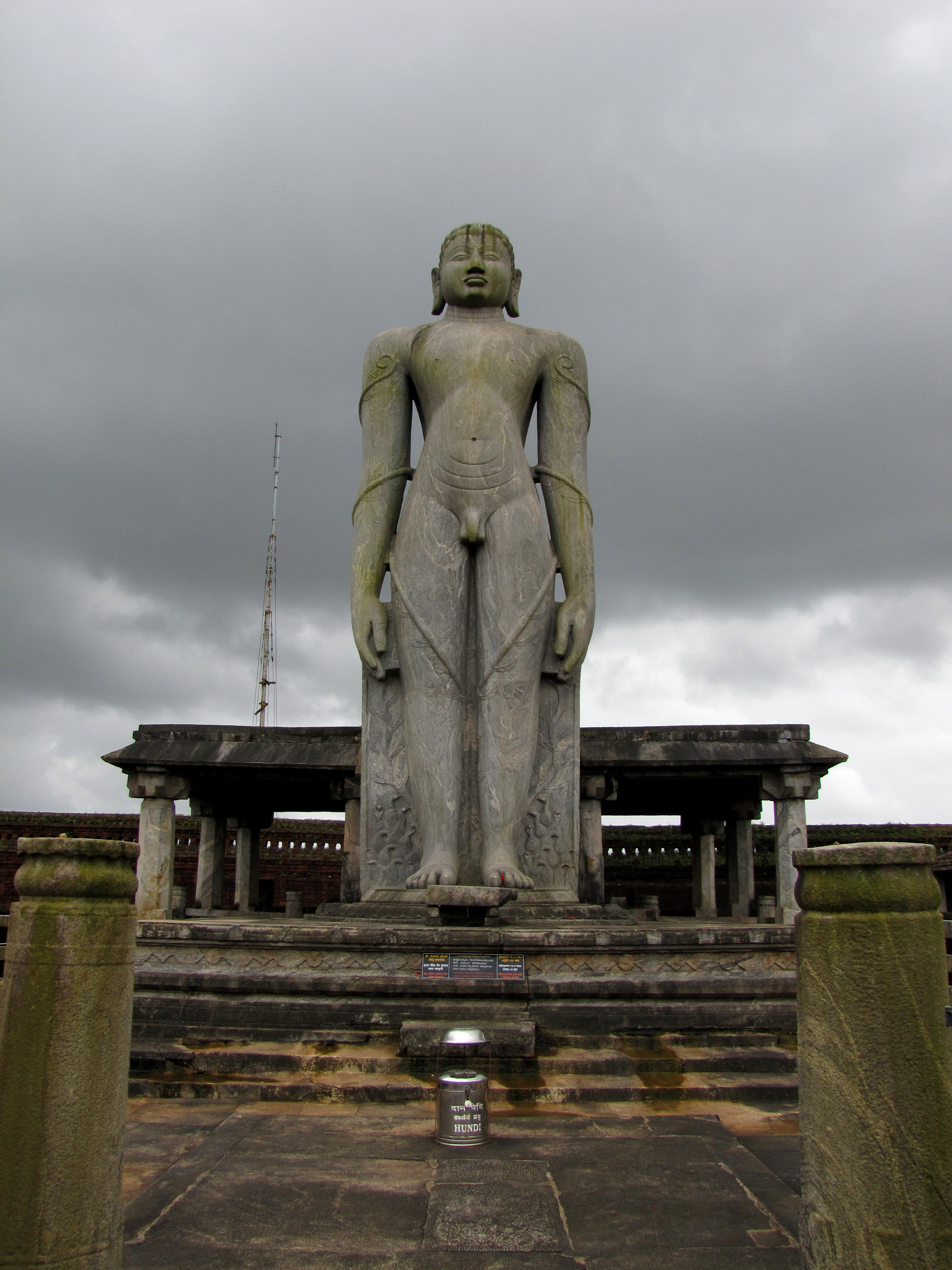
The Monolith of Bahubali in Karkala was erected by Veera Pandya Bhairarasa of Santara-Bhairarasa dynasty in 1432 C.E.

Santara or Bhairarasa (Note: Alternate forms of the dynasty's name include Santha, Santa, Santhara. The kings of the dynasty also attached titles like Pandya and Odeya to their names.) was a medieval ruling dynasty of Karnataka, India. The area covered by their kingdom included territories in the Malenadu region as well as the coastal districts of Karnataka. Their kingdom had two capitals. Karkala in the coastal plains and Kalasa in the Western Ghats. Hence the territory they ruled was also known as the Kalasa-Karkala kingdom. The Santaras Dynasty and Alupa royal family both adherents of Jainism, are recorded to have maintained matrimonial alliances. The Santaras became the feudatories of the Vijayanagara Empire after its rise. During this period, the Santara ruler Veera Pandya Bhairarasa erected the monolith of Bahubali in Karkala. The dynasty passed into oblivion after invasions by the Nayakas of Keladi and later by Hyder Ali.

== Origins ==
Jinadatta Raya or Jindutt Rai, a Jain prince from Mathura in Northern India was the supposed founder of the dynasty. He is said to have migrated to the town of Humcha with an idol of the Jain deity Padmavati laying the foundation of the kingdom in Humcha. He also built the Humcha Jain temples.

The dynasty founded by Jinadatta appears to have split into two branches by the 12 century C.E. One branch being stationed in Kalasa and another in Hosagunda of Shimoga district. Gradually these branches shifted their capitals to Keravashe and Karkala both in the old South Canara district.

The Santaras built a number of Jain monuments and patronised Jainism for nearly a thousand years in the Tulu Nadu and Malenadu region of Karnataka. They donated two villages for maintenance of Jain monks at Panchakuta basadi at Nagar taluq of Shimoga district.

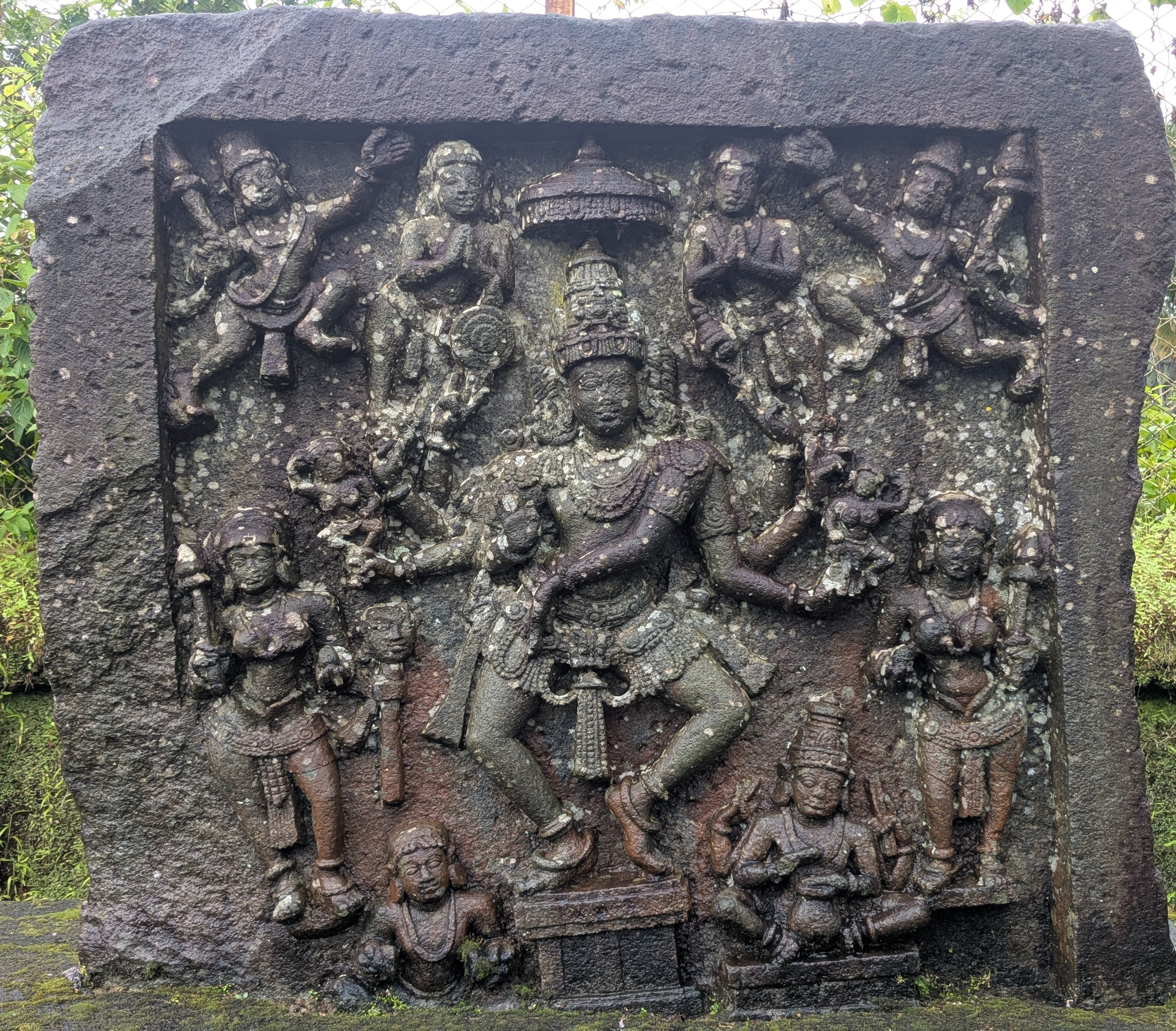
Dancing Sculpture, Santara Dynasty art

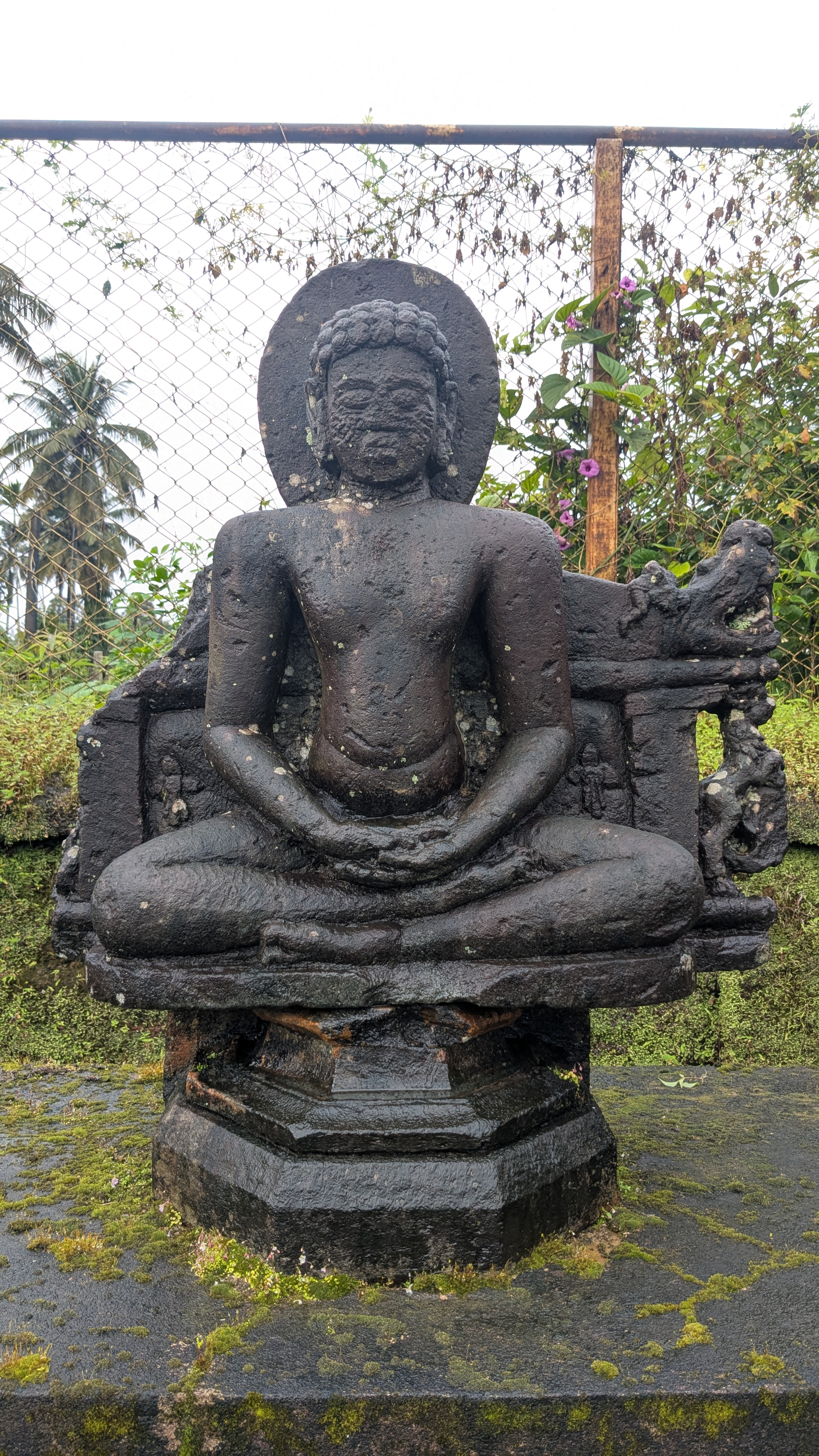
Jain Monuments at Humcha

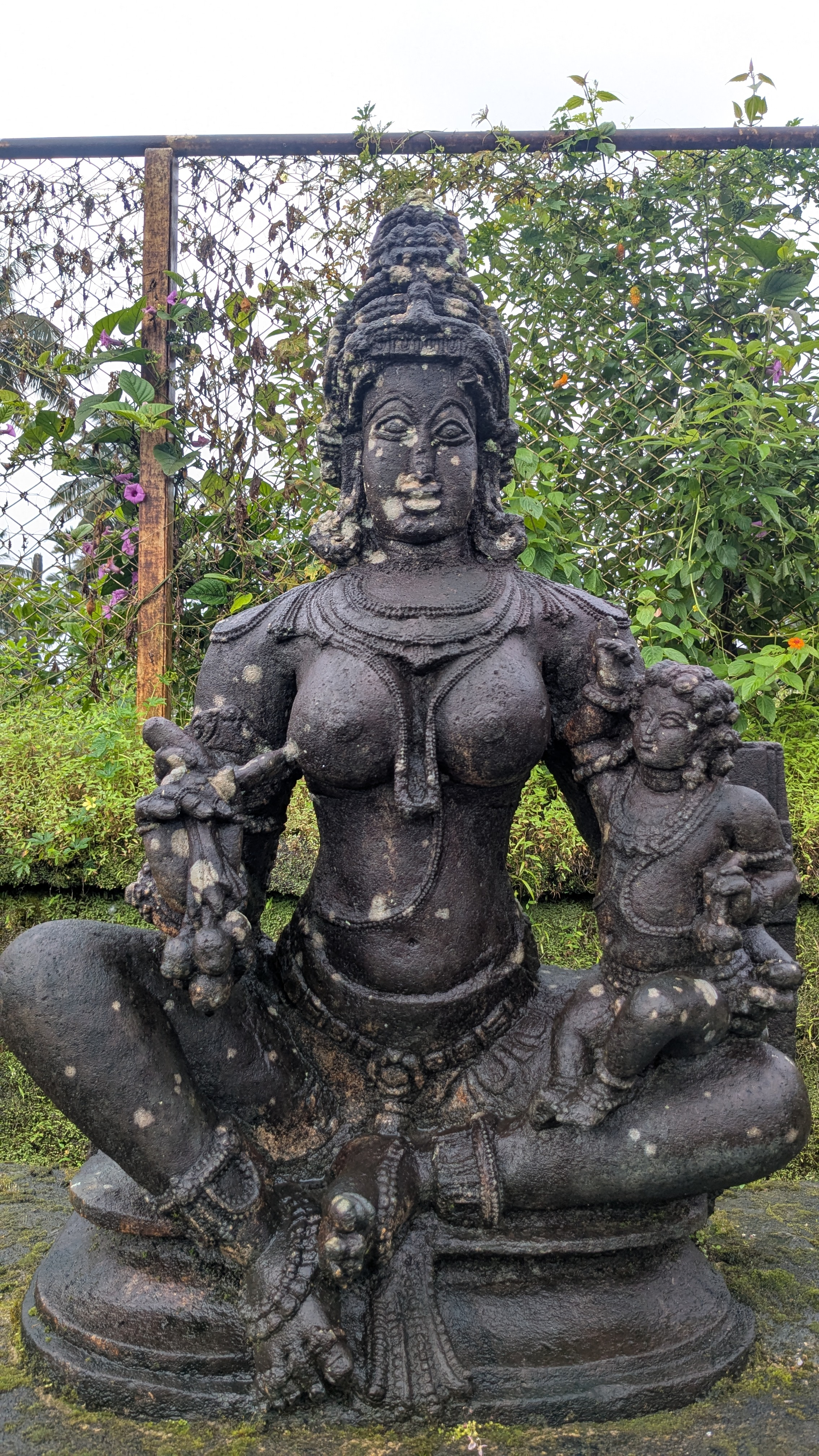
Santara-period sculpture of a women

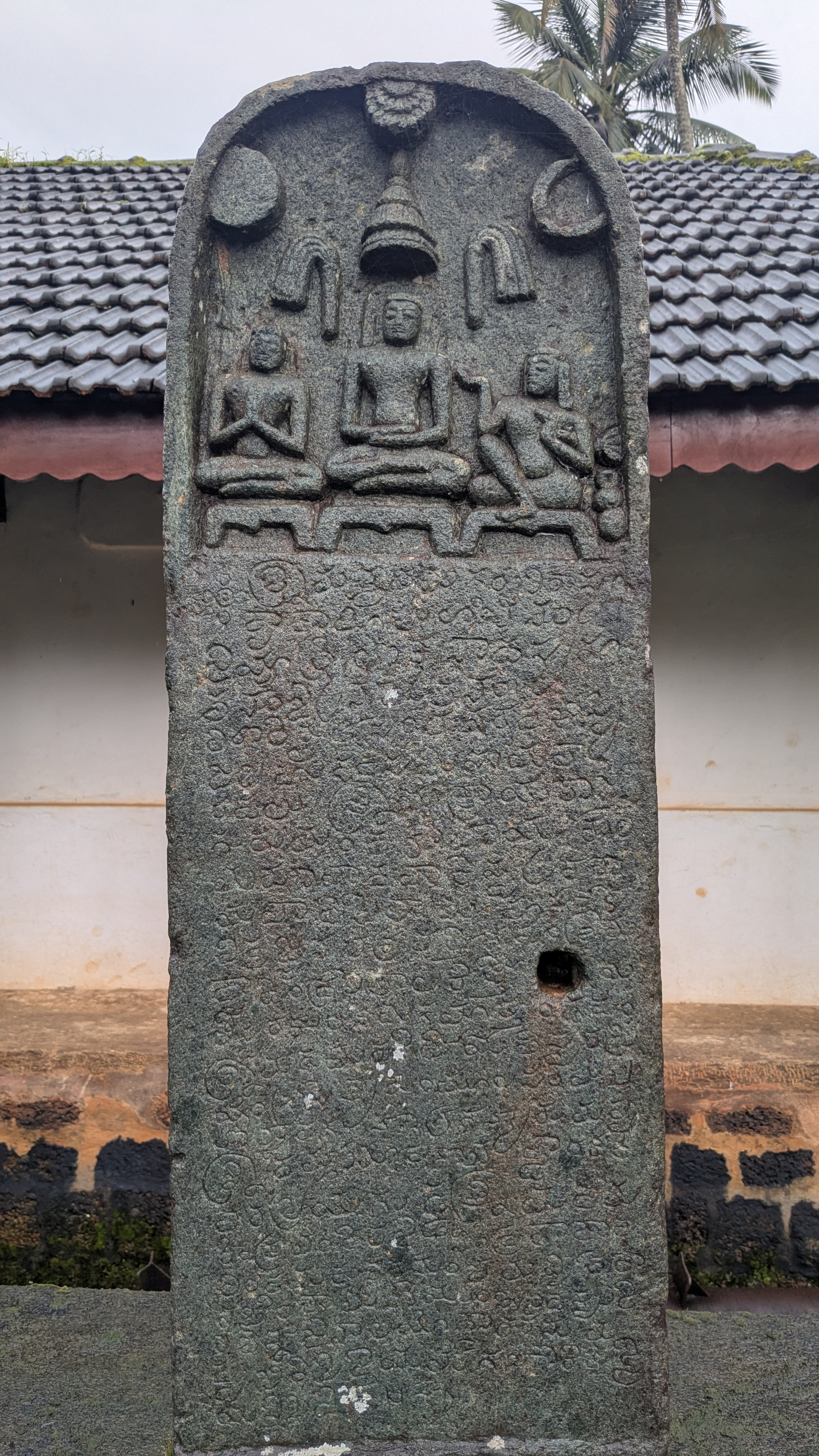
Stone Inscription, Humcha

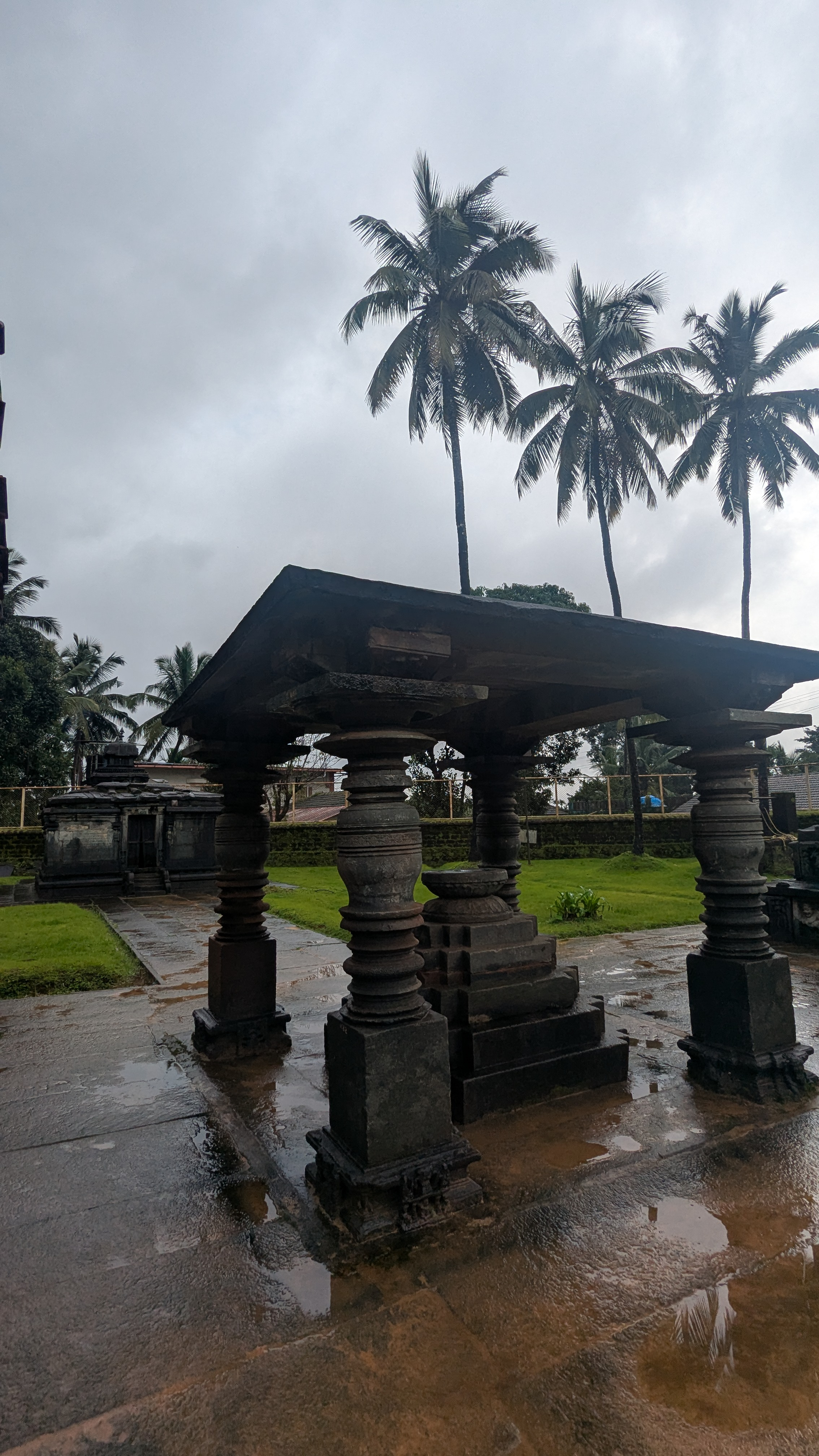
Ancient Sri Parswanatha Basadi, Humcha
