= Humcha =

Hombuja Humcha, Humbaj, Hamchawadi
- Town
- Humcha
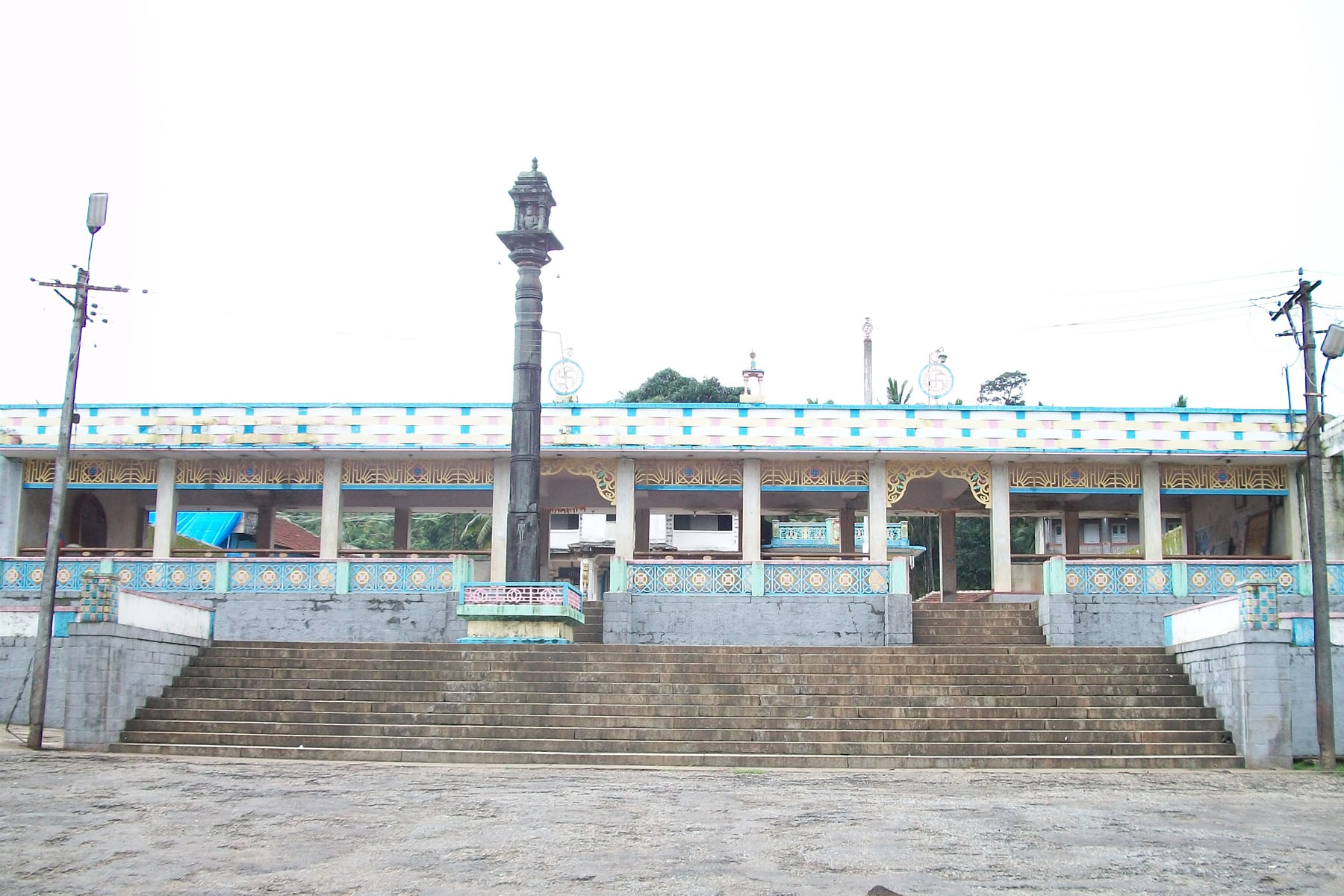
- Humcha Basadi
- Nickname: Pombuchha
- Location in Karnataka, India Hombuja (India)
- Coordinates: 13°52′29″N 75°14′2″E
- Country: India
- State: Karnataka
- District: Shimoga District

Government
  - Body: Gram panchayat
- Elevation: 644 m (2,113 ft)

Languages
  - Official: Kannada
- Time zone: UTC+5:30 (IST)
- Area code: 577436
- Nearest city: Ripponpet
- Website: http://hombujapadmavati.org/

Humcha / Hombuja is a small town near Ripponpet, Hosanagara taluk in Shimoga district in the Indian state of Karnataka. Humbaja Atishaya Jain Teerth Kshetra is famous for being home to an ancient temple of Goddess Padmavati, and to the Humbaj Matha (seminary/monastery), an important institution of the Jain community. This temple is considered to be very holy and is known for its cultural and historical heritage. Other notable highlights of the place are a lake that reputedly never dries up and a tree that likewise always remains green.

Jain devotees of this holy place are everywhere throughout India and also in foreign countries. Thousands of devotees come to the Hombaja every year for fulfillment of their desires.

== History ==
Humcha is an important Jain pilgrim centre from the period of 8th - 16th century. Santara rulers made it their capital. Also Hombuja is said to be garbhasthala or origin of Jainism in the southern India.

=== Santara dynasty ===
The History of this region is also associated with Santara or Bhairarasa dynasty. Santara or Bhairarasa is the name of a medieval ruling dynasty of Karnataka, India.

Jinadatta Raya, a Jain prince from Mathura in Northern India was the supposed founder of the dynasty. He is said to have migrated to the town of Humcha with an idol of the Jain deity Padmavati, laying the foundation of the kingdom in Humcha. The area covered by their kingdom included territories in the Malenadu region as well as the coastal districts of Karnataka. The dynasty founded by Jinadatta appears to have split into two branches by the 12 century C.E. One branch being stationed in Hosagunda of Shimoga district and Kalasa in the Western ghats, chikkamagalur district. Gradually these branches (or only the Kalasa branch) shifted their capitals to Keravashe (14 km north-east of Karkala) and Karkala both in the old South Canara district. Hence the territory they ruled was also known as the Kalasa-Karkala kingdom.

Edgar Thurston mentions that the Bhairarasas or Santaras were among the powerful Bunt chiefs who seem to have exercised control over a greater part of the Tuluva country before the rise of the Vijayanagara Empire. The Santaras were Jains and had matrimonial relations with the Saivite Alupa royal family of the canara region. The Santaras built a number of Jain monuments and were responsible for the spread of Jainism in the Tulu Nadu and Malenadu region of Karnataka. During this period the Santara ruler Veera Pandya Bhairarasa erected the monolith of Bahubali in Karkala.

The kingdom seems to be streched from Sagara Karnataka to todays Bantwala and Narasimharajpura in the East to Arabian Sea in west on Udupi Manipal region.

The Santaras became the feudatories of the Vijayanagara Empire after its rise.

The dynasty passed into oblivion after invasions by the Nayakas of Keladi and later by Hyder Ali

== The Jain Matha (Mutt) at Hombuja ==
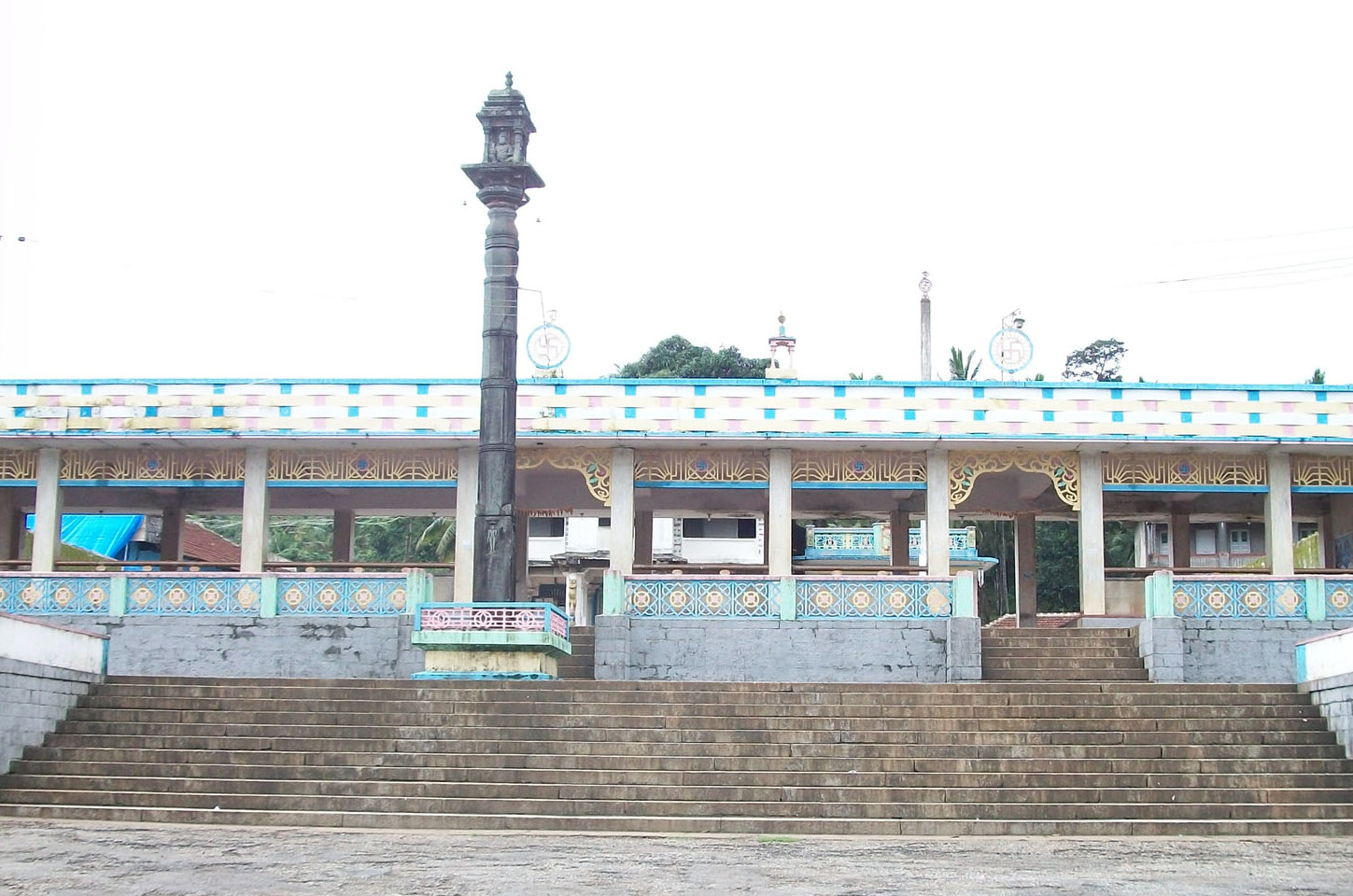
Humcha Jain temples

The Bhattaraka seat at Humcha, famous for the Humcha Padmavati temple, was founded in the 8th century AD, during the reign of Jinadatta Raya, founder of the ruling dynasty of Santara. We can find first references of Santharas in the inscriptions installed by the Chalukyan king Vinayaditya. Santhara kingdom was established by Jinadattaraya. He was a staunch follower of Jainism and had donated a village by name Kumbhasikapura for carrying out day to day abisheka of Jain idols.

Vikrama Santha had built a separate residence to his guru Mouni Siddantha Bhattaraka of kunda Kundanvaya tradition in 897 A.D. The Gudda Basadi was built by him and he had donated the idol of Lord Bahubali to be installed at the temple. Bhujabali Santha had built a Jain temple at Hombuja and had named it after him. Further, he had donated the village Harivara for the well-being of his guru Kanakanandi deva. Nanni Santha, brother of Bhujabali Santha was a staunch follower of Jainism & was very much involved in pooja and other rituals.

An inscription of A.D. 1103 states that Malla Santha in memory of his wife Veera Abbarasi and in honour to his Guru Vadigaratta Ajithasena Pandita Deva had laid the foundation stone of a temple at Hombuja. This temple was built in front of the present Pancha Basadi. Bhujbalaganga Permadi (A.D. 1115) one of the rulers of Hombuja had renovated a temple and had donated several villages to it. This temple was built by Dadiga and Madhava the founders of Ganga kingdom. Nanniyaganga, son of Bhujabalaganga renovated the same temple in A.D. 1122 and donated some lands to the temple. Nanniyaganga built 25 Jain temples for popularising the religion. Veerasantha (A.D. 1172) who succeeded Nanniyaganga was called as "Jinadevana Charana Kamalgala Bhrama" as a mark of respect to his contribution to Jainism.

In 1048 AD, the Mahamandaleshwara Chandarayarus made a donation to a Bhattaraka of Balagara-gana at Balligame near Banavasi in present-day Karnataka. Thus, the Bhattaraka seat at Humcha may be one of the oldest of its kind. The most widespread Bhattaraka order has historically been the MulaSangh-NandiSangh-BalatkaraGana-SaraswatiGachchha (MNBS) order. It has seats at Surat, Idar, Ajmer, Jaipur, Chittor, Nagaur, Delhi, Gwalior, Chanderi, Sironj and many other places. There are perhaps hundreds of thousands of Tirthankara idols, spread across the country from Surat to Decca (in Bangladesh), bearing inscriptions mentioning this order. Most of these idols were installed by the Bhattarakas of this order in the past seven or eight centuries. Many of these Bhattarakas were great scholars and prolific authors.

The ancient institution at Humcha is the original home of the MNBS order. It is headed by Sri Devendrakeerthi Bhattarakha Swamiji. He is the only existing Bhattaraka of the MNBS order, since all the Bhattaraka seats in north India became extinct in the early part of the 20th century. Several Jain organizations are run by the institute at Humcha. This temple also features a 21 feet idol of Lord Parshvanatha.

The Panchakuta Basadi was built in 1077 by Chattaladevi.

An annual Rathayatra Mahotsava of Lord Parshwanatha and Goddess Padmavati is held with other programmes at Humcha during the months of March/April under the guidance of Devendrakeerthi Bhattarakha Swamiji.

Important events during annual Rathotsava are

- Ganadhara Valaya Aradhana
- Kalyana Mandira Aradhana
- Bhaktamara Aradhana
- Nagavahanotsava
- Simhavahanotsava
- Pushparathotsava
- Moolanakshatra
- Maharathotsava
- 108 Kalasha Abhisheka to Lord Parshwanatha at Guddada Basadi
- Kunkuma Utsava & Dhwajarohana

Places to visit in Humcha

1 Padmavathi Basadi

2. Parshwanath Basadi

3. Kshetrapala Basadi

4. Saraswati temple

5. Bogar Basadi

6. Muttina kere

7. Pancha Basadi

8. Makkala Basadi

9. Kumadvati Teertha.

10. Guddada Basadi

11. Palace Ruins

== See also ==
- Balatkara Gana
- Jainism
- Jainism in Karnataka
