= Humcha Jain temples =

Jain temples in the state of Karnataka

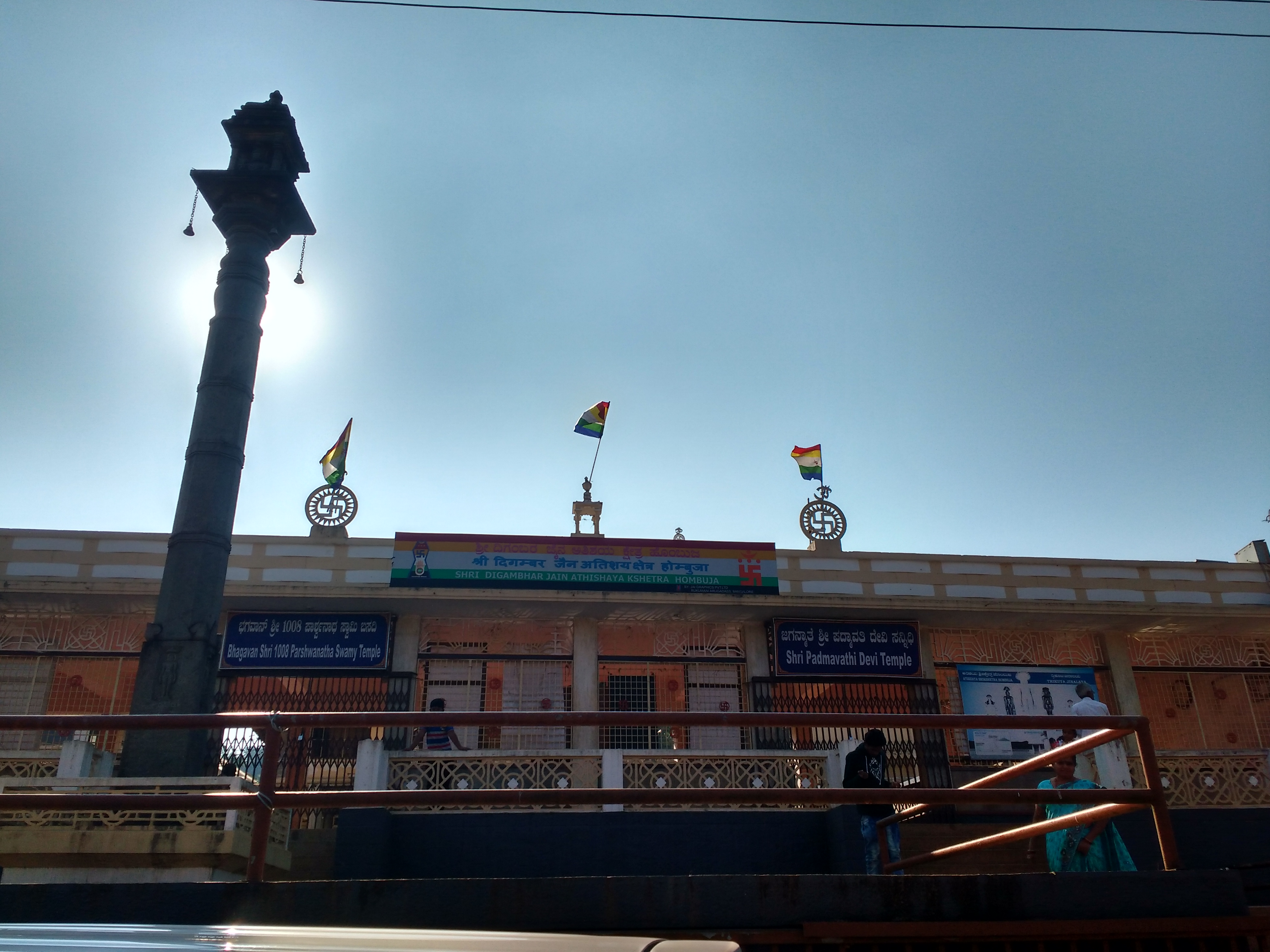
- Matada Basadi

Religion
- Affiliation: Jainism
- Deity: Parshvanatha, Padmavati
- Festivals: Mahavir Jayanti, Ratha Yatra, Navaratri
- Governing body: Humcha Matha

Location
- Location: Humcha, Shimoga, Karnataka
- Interactive map of Humcha Jain temples
- Coordinates: 13°51′42″N 75°12′21″E

Architecture
- Style: Badami Chalukya architecture
- Creator: Jinadatta Raya
- Established: 7th century
- Temple: 10

Website
- www.hombujapadmavati.org

The Humcha Jain temples or Humcha basadis are a group of temples found in Humcha village of Shimoga district in Karnataka, India. They were constructed in the 7th century CE in the period of the Santara dynasty and are regarded as one of the major Jain centres of Karnataka. The Padmavati Basadi is the most well-known of these temples.

Humcha was an active Jain pilgrimage centre from approximately the 8th century and preserves a group of temples constructed under the patronage of the Santara rulers. The site is particularly important for the worship of Padmavati, the yakshini of Parshvanatha.

== History ==
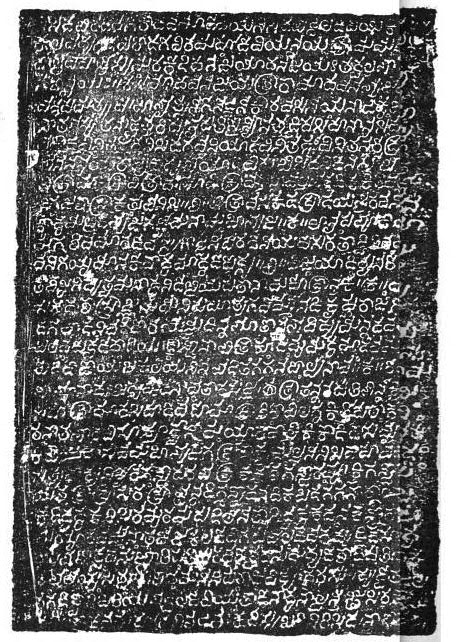
Inscription of Vikramaditya VI, Western Chalukya inside Panchkuta Basadi

Humcha has been a major Jain centre since the establishment of the seat of the Bhattaraka (head of Digambara institutions) in the 7th–8th century CE by Jinadatta Raya, founder of the Santara dynasty. Historical and epigraphic evidence places the rise of the Santaras at Humcha in the early medieval period. The dynasty's traditional founder was Jinadatta Raya, whose association with Humcha and Padmavati subsequently became the subject of an elaborate Jain religious tradition. The surviving architectural remains do not, however, establish that the present temples themselves date to the 7th century. The earliest temple identified in archaeological studies is the Paliyakka Basadi, dated to the 9th century; it no longer survives as an intact structure. The current structure of the Padmavati temple was built by Vira Santara in 1061 CE.

Vikrama Santara built Guddada Basadi, dedicated to Bahubali, in 897 CE, and the Parshvanath temple in 950 CE. The Santara rulers granted land, gold, and other gifts as offerings for worship and religious activities. Bhujabala Santaradeva, of the Chalukya dynasty, made similar grants to Bhujabala Santara Jinalaya. The largest surviving historic monument at Humcha, the Panchakuta Basadi, was constructed in 1077 CE by Chattaladevi. Contemporary inscriptions refer to the temple as Urvitilaka Jinalaya ("glory of the world").

The Bhattaraka's seat at Humcha is one of fourteen surviving seats of the original 36. The earliest inscription dates back to the 9th century CE. An 11th century inscription refers to a shrine dedicated to the cult of Padmavati. The Ratta and Shilahara dynasties also worshiped Padmavati as their tutelary deity. Humcha received royal patronage until Vishnuvardhana of Hoysala Empire converted to Hindu Vaishnavism in 1117 or 1132 CE. A 12th century nishidhi stone mentions a woman named Piriyarasi performing Sallekhana during the reign of Mahamandaleshwar Bomma Santi Deva, a local chief under Western Chalukya Empire. According to an inscription dated 1530 CE, the viceroy of Sriranganagara converted from the Franconian faith to Jainism under the influence of Āchārya Vidyananda. A total of 43 inscriptions has been discovered at this site. According to Pārśvanātha-Padmāvatī-labdhavaraprasanna in seal, the bhaṭṭārakas of Malkheda were confirmed at the Padmavati Basadi.

The basadi complex is maintained by Humcha Matha and protected by the Archaeological Survey of India. The temples have since undergone repairs, renovations, and modifications.

== Legend ==
Jinadatta, a royal prince of Mathura in the Solar dynasty, fled home after his father, Sahakara, attempted to murder him. Sahakara, under the influence of his second son Mardatta, had sought to ensure that the latter would be the successor to the throne. Jindatta fled to South India, and, heeding the counsel of Jain monk Muni Siddhanta, carried a golden idol of Padmavati on his back to protect him on his journey. On the way, while resting under a kari lakki tree, Jindatta had a dream in which Padmavati told him to establish his capital at that place, with the help of people living in the forest. Jinadatta proceeded to found the city of Pombuccapura (modern-day Humcha) and built two temples dedicated to Parshvanatha. He also founded a shrine of Padmavati near the tree where he had his dream, installing an idol of the Goddess as presiding deity of the temple.

== Architecture ==
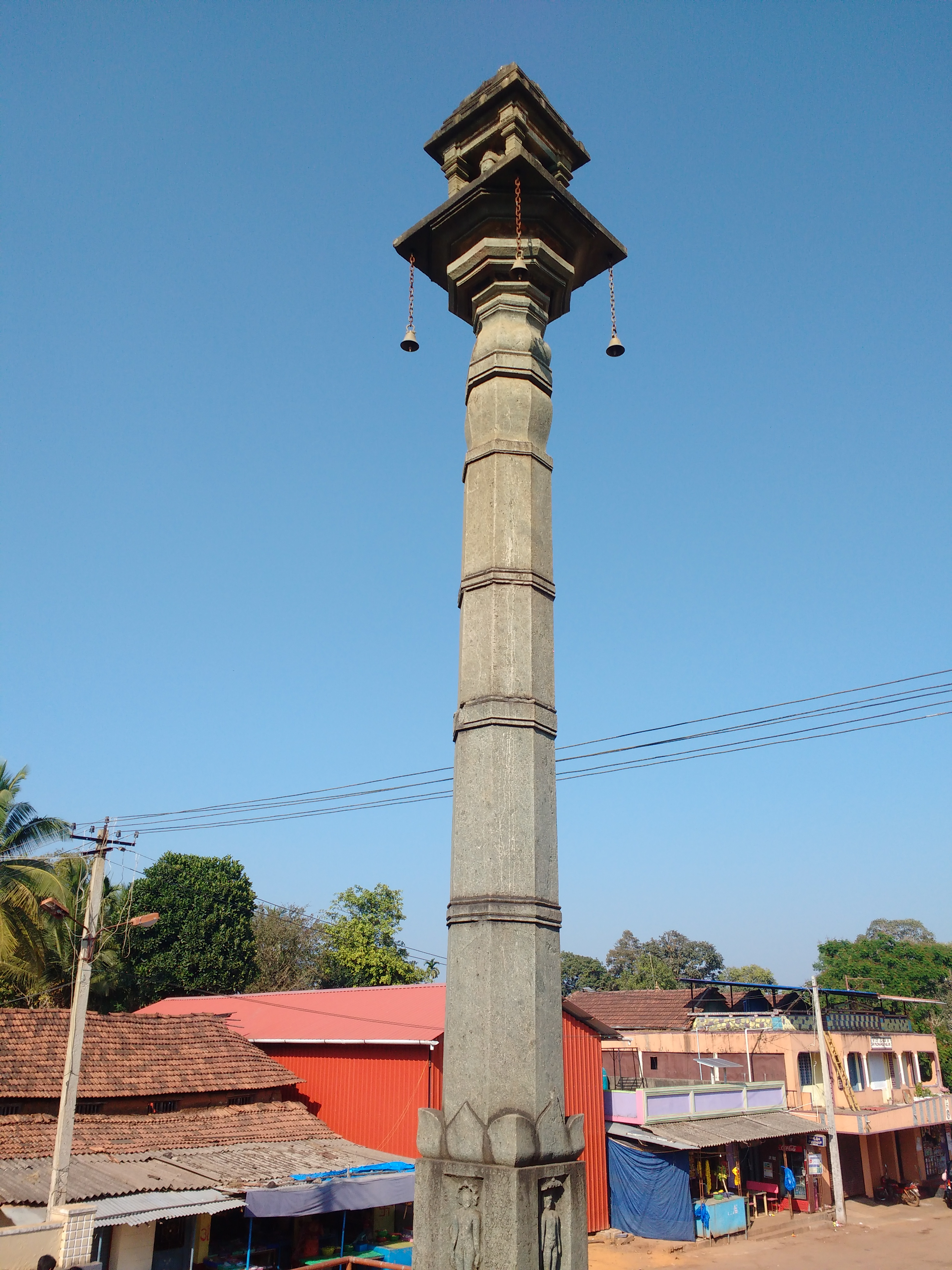
Manastambha

The noteworthy architecture of the Humcha Basadi comprises temples classified as either early phase or later phase, based on the architectural style of each. The early phase temples include a square Vimana with a small antarala and a closed mahamandapa, which is broader than the garbhagriha, and include pillars with ornate carvings. The later phase temples are constructed in a rectangular shape, crowned with Brahmachanda Sikhara in an incorporated built-in Dravidian style. The Makara torana is an important feature of the architectural style of the Santara period.

Panchkuta Basadi, originally known as Urdhvitilaka (glory of the world) according to inscriptions, is the largest temple in Humcha. The temple was built in the Chalukyan style in 1077 CE by Chattaladevi, the wife of Kaduvetti, a Kadava (Pallava dynasty) chief. Chattaladevi commissioned the temple under the spiritual guidance of Acharya Vijaya Bhattaraka. Inscriptions praise the monument as Urvitilaka Jinalaya. Panchkuta Basadi derives its name from five garbhagriha inside the temple. These five share a common plinth arranged in a row to form a navaranga, mahamandapa, and mukhamandapa in common. In front of the temple are two small shrines dedicated to Parshvanatha and Bahubali. Only three idols – of Neminatha, Shantinatha, and Parshvanatha – remain of the original five in the garbhagriha of Panchkuta Basadi. The navaranga of the temple consists of ten ankanaswith and three doors, and it houses images of yaksha and yakshi Jwalamalini.

Before Panchkuta Basadi is a tall, ornate pillar called a manastambha; this one is known for its architectural details and is considered the best example of Jain architectural style. The pillar was commissioned along with the Panchakuta Basadi by Chattaladevi in 1077 CE. It rises to approximately 40 feet (12 m) and stands on a decorated, tiered stone platform. The pillar stands on a three-tiered platform; the lowest tier displays carvings of four elephants at the four corners and another four elephants on the four faces, which are oriented to the cardinal directions; reliefs of lions appear between the elephants. A statue of Brahmadeva surmounts the pillar as the guardian yaksha.

Pâḷiyakka Basadi is ruined temple constructed in 878 CE (Shaka year 800) according to an inscription dated 950 CE. Guḍḍada Basadi, dedicated to Bahubali, was constructed in 898 CE during the reign of Vikramaditya VI. There is another 10th century ruins of a Jain basadi believed to be dedicated to Chandraprabha.

== About the temples ==
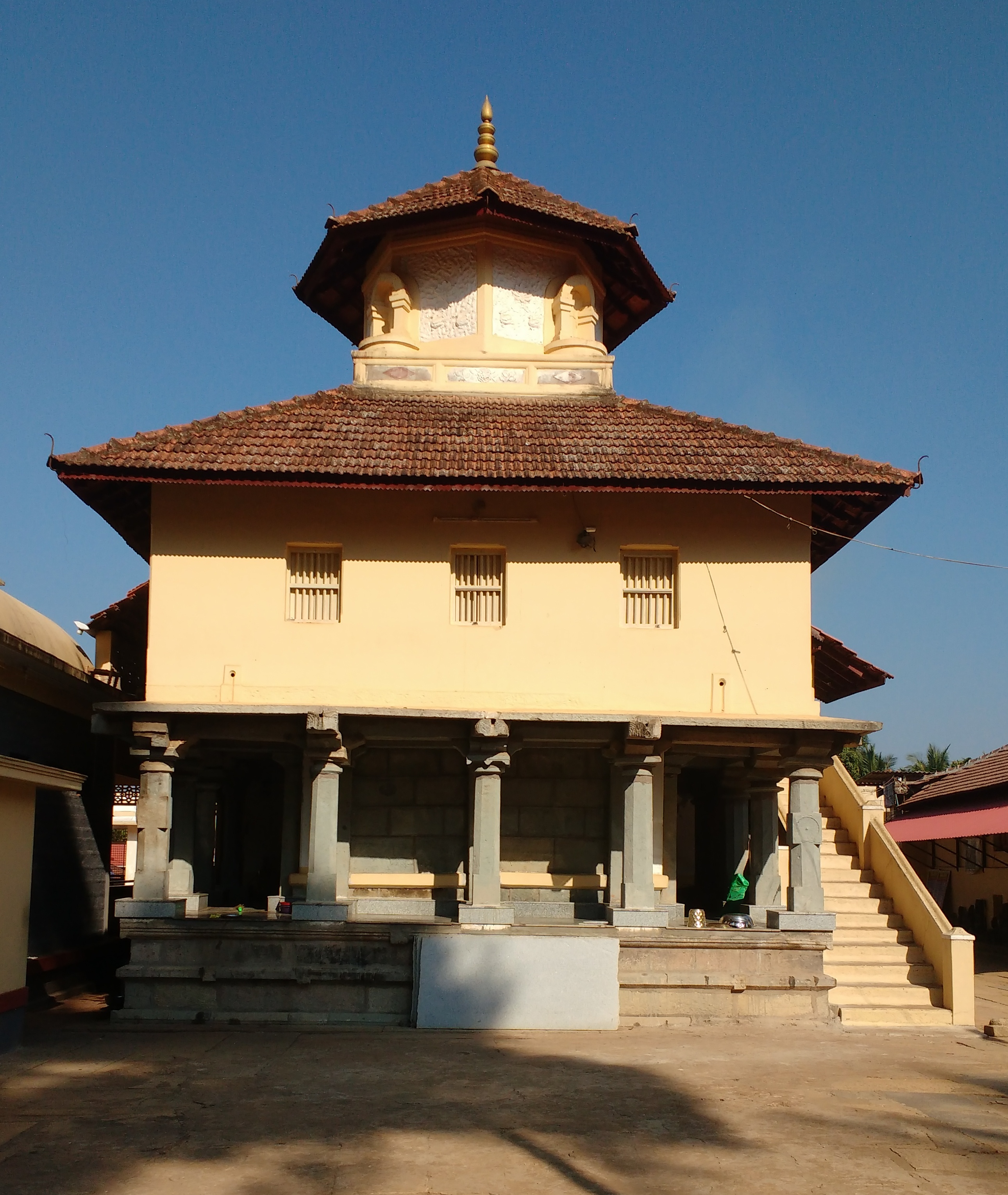
Panchkuta Basadi

The Jain temples in Humcha Basadi complex belong to the Digambar sect of Jainism and are considered one of the great Jain centres of Karnataka. The Padmavati temple is near the same lakki tree where Padmavati told Jinadatta in his dream to build his capital. According to Jain belief, the Goddess entered the lakki tree, and the same tree is still growing beside the temple. The Humcha Jain temple complex is an important centre for the cult of Padmavati. Each Friday is a particularly prominent day of worship. The Panchkuta Basadi houses a golden-coloured idol of Padmavati carrying a lotus and a goad in the lower right and upper right hand, respectively, and a noose in the lower hand. Two idols of Ambika belonging to the 10th and 11th century are equally noteworthy.

Two smaller shrines dedicated to Bahubali and Parshvanatha stands on either side of the main temple. These structures were added later in 1075 CE.

== Humcha Matha ==
The complex includes a Humcha Matha built by Jain monks. The matha premises include the Padmavathi temple, Parshwanatha Basadi, Marthanda Basadi, Bogara Basadi, Jattigaraya Basadi, and Bahubali temple. Humcha also has three monolithic statues of Bahubali with heights of 12 feet (3.7 m), 10 feet (3.0 m), and 7 feet (2.1 m), respectively.

== Festivals ==
Humcha is especially significant within Digambara Jainism as a major centre of Padmavati worship. The association between Parshvanatha and Padmavati is reflected both in the temples of the complex and in the religious traditions concerning the foundation of Humcha. The primary festival of the temple is Ratha Yatra of Padmavati, organised annually on the moola nakshatra day in March. Navaratri is also organised and celebrated by the temple.

== See also ==
- Mel Sithamur Jain Math
- Padmakshi Gutta
- Kundadri
- Humcha
