= Panchakuta Basadi =

Panchakuta Basadi may refer to:

- Panchakuta Basadi, Kambadahalli, a temple complex in the village of Kambadahalli, Karnataka, India
- Panchakuta Basadi, Humcha, an ancient temple in the village of Humcha, Karnataka, India
