= Padmakshi Temple =

Hindu temple dedicated to Lakshmi

Padmakshi Devasthanam
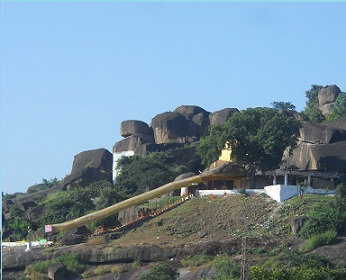

- Location in India

Religion
- Affiliation: Hinduism
- District: Hanamakonda
- Deity: Padmakshi (Lakshmi) original Padmāvatī (Jainism)

Location
- Location: Hanamakonda
- State: Telangana
- Country: India
- Coordinates: 17.9979519°N 79.5669959°E

Architecture
- Established: 12th century

Specifications
- Temple: 1
- Elevation: 299 m (981 ft)

Padmakshi Temple is one of the oldest temples in the Hanamakonda area of Telangana, India. It is dedicated to the Hindu goddess Padmakshi (Lakshmi) originally Jain Goddess Padmāvatī.

The site originally is Jain shrine Kadalalaya Basadi was established in 1117 CE, during the rule of the Kakatiya chief Prola II was built for 23rd Tirthankara Pārśvanātha along with his Yaksha Dharnendra and Yakshi Padmāvatī later, the Jain shrine was converted by making yakshi into hindu goddess Padmavati (Hinduism) as Hindu temple. The digambara Jain idol of Parswanatha was covered up with cement by Hindus in 19th century. The Jains attempted to regain control of the site in the 19th century, but a commission set up the Nizam of Hyderabad concluded that the site will be Hindu shrine.

== History ==
Probably sometime after the 1156 CE, the Brahmanical shrine replaced the Jain shrine, possibly due to the influence of the Veerashaivas. In the 19th century, the Jains appealed to the Nizam of Hyderabad to grant them the control of the site, arguing that it was originally a Jain shrine. The Nizam instituted a commission to investigate the Jain claim, and concluded that the earliest shrine at the site belonged to the Hindus. In 1869 CE, the Nizam granted land for the maintenance of the temple.

== Architecture ==
An impressive feature of the temple is the four faces of the Annakonda pillar, which is a quadrangular column made of Black granite stone at the temple's entrance.

The temple has rich sculpture of the Jain Tirthankaras and other Jain gods and goddesses.

The present Padmakshi herself is a Jain yakshini of Pārśvanātha called Amrakushmandini along with yaksha Dharnendra and with a huge naked image of Parahwanatha in the middle of both.

Once a year, Lakhs of women arrive to celebrate the famous Bathukamma festival and immerse flowers in the pond at the foot of the Padmakshi hillock.

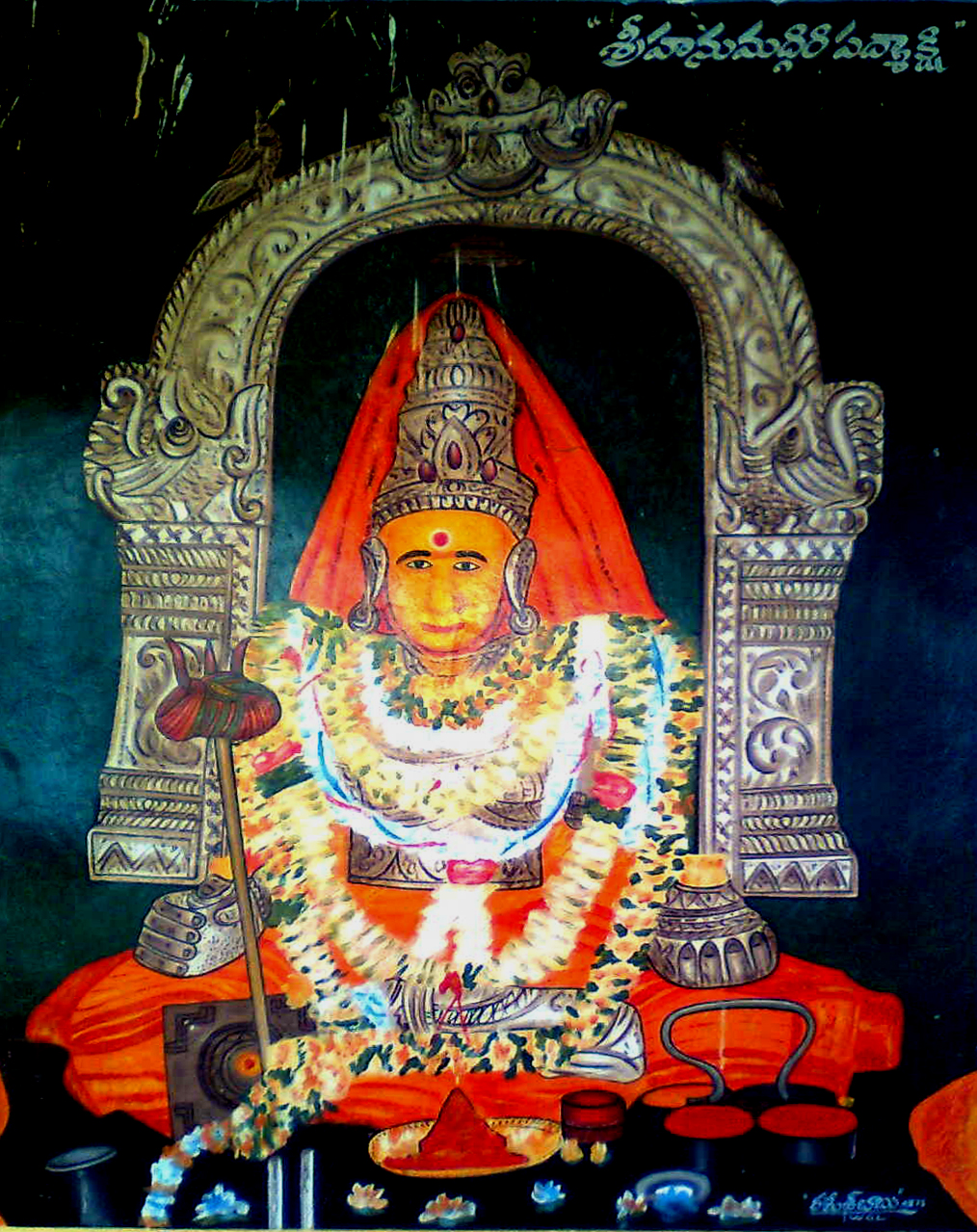
Painting of Goddess Padmakshi at Padmakshi Gutta

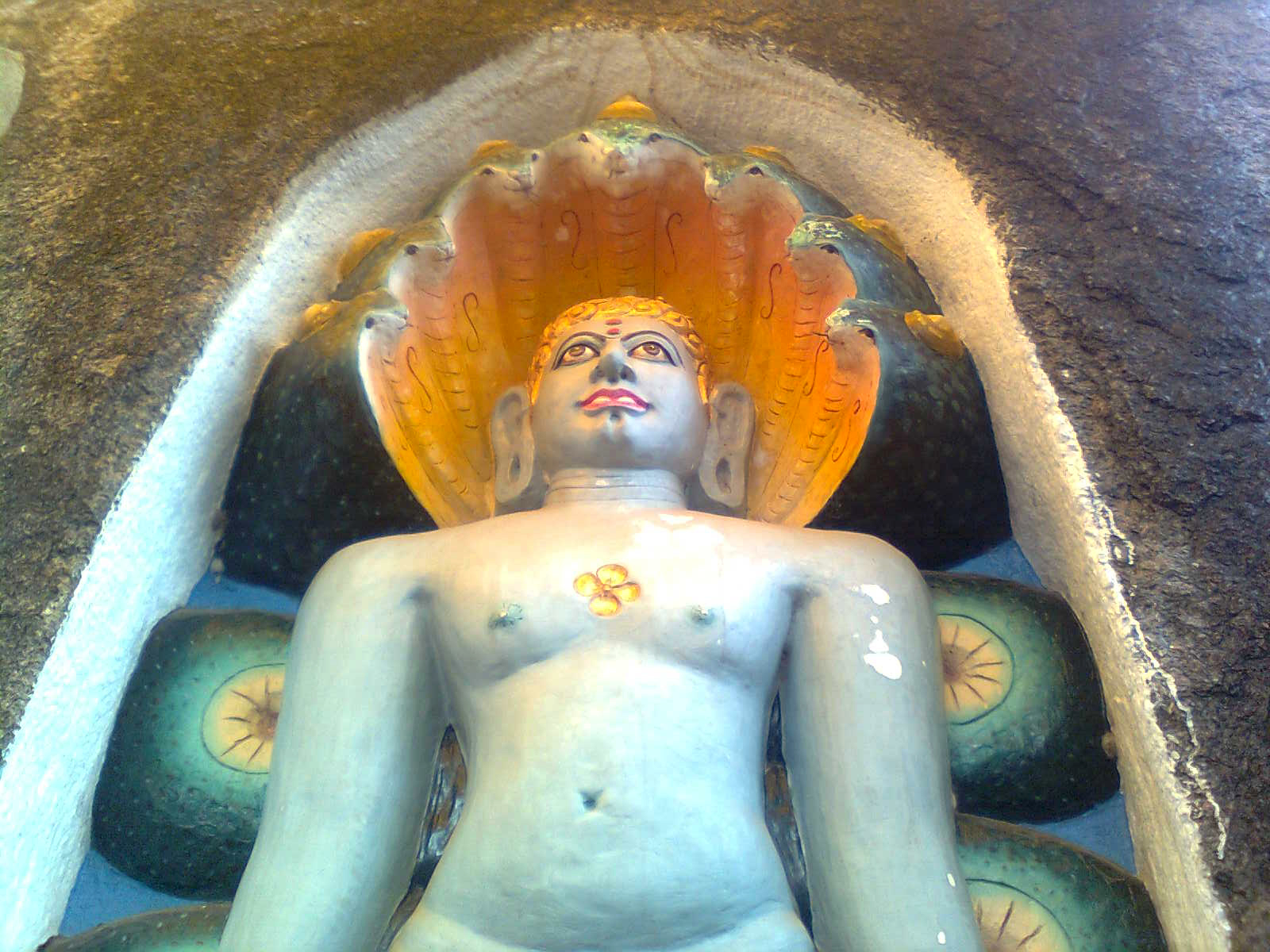
Statue of Parshvantha

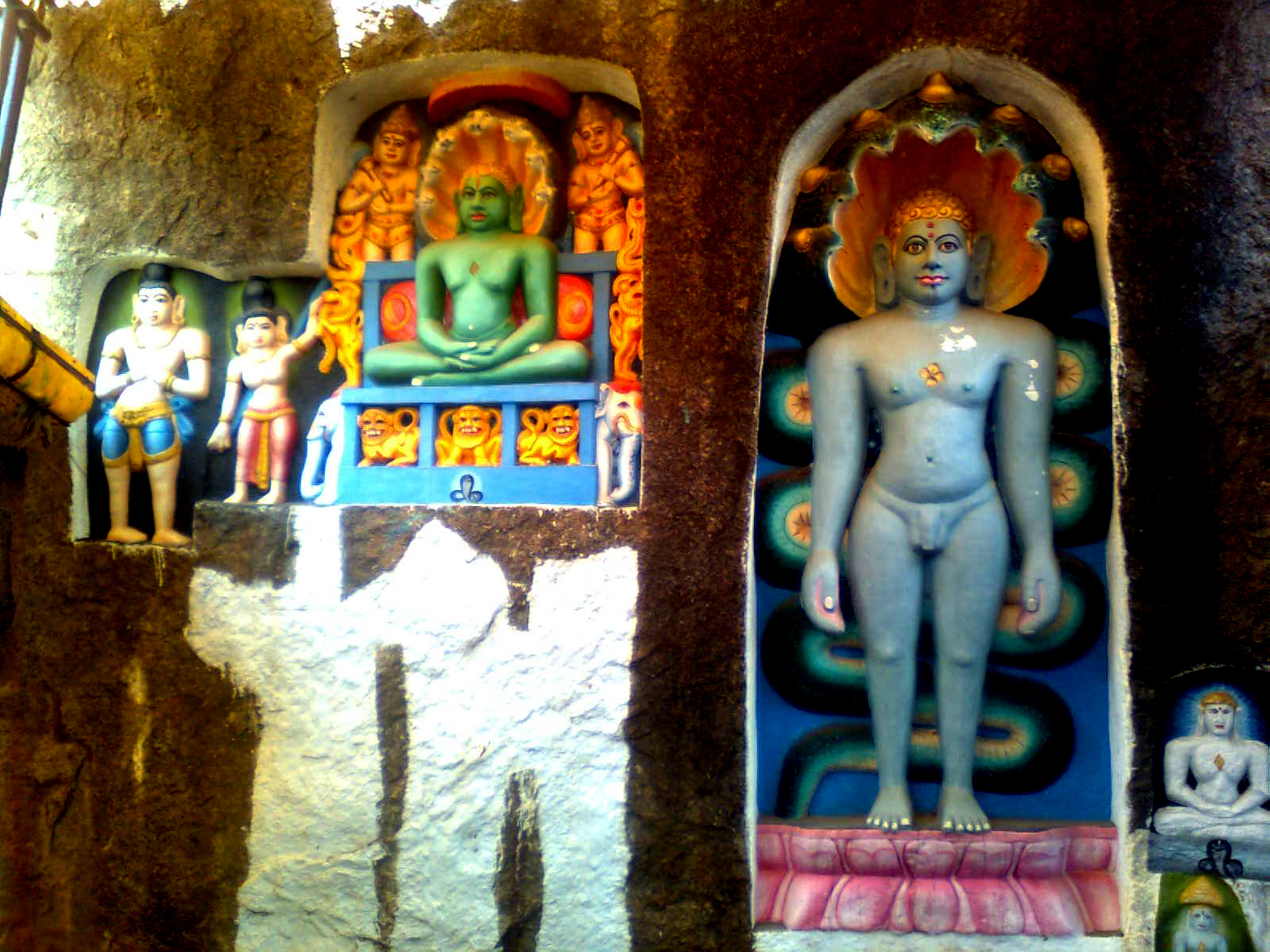
Jain Tirthankara reliefs at Padmakshi Gutta

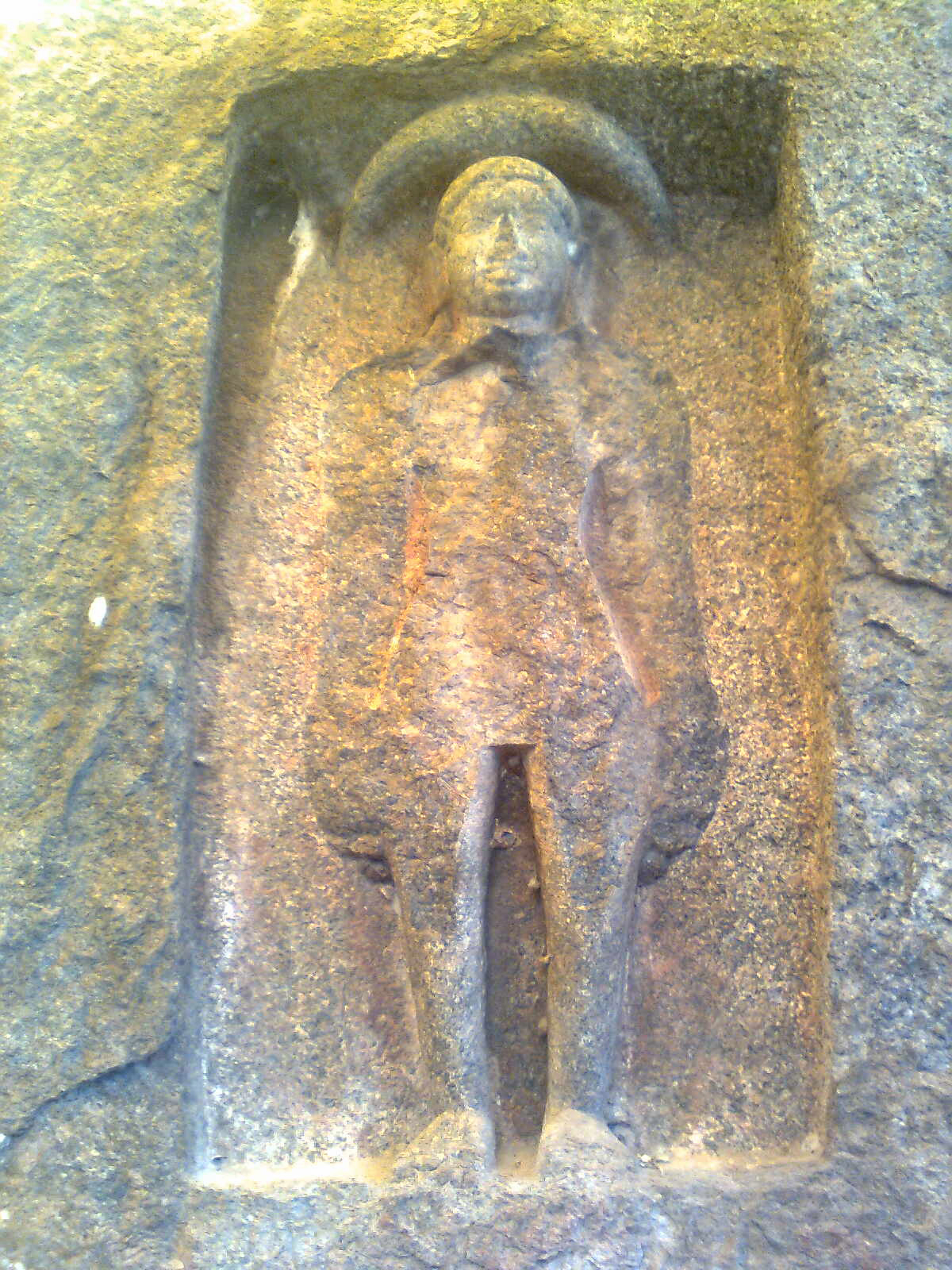
Jain Tirthankara reliefs at Padmakshi Gutta

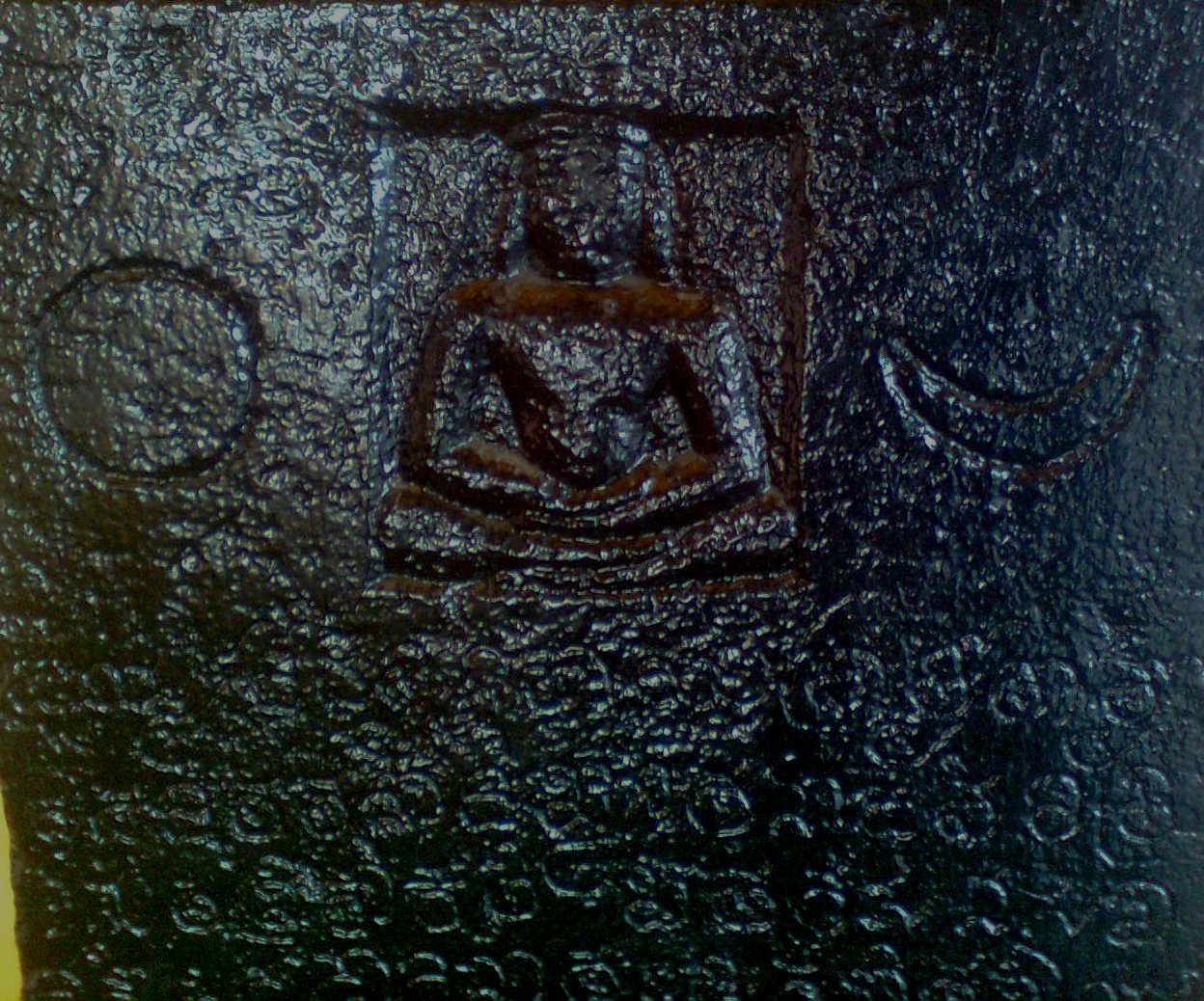
Jain Tirthankara reliefs at Padmakshi Gutta

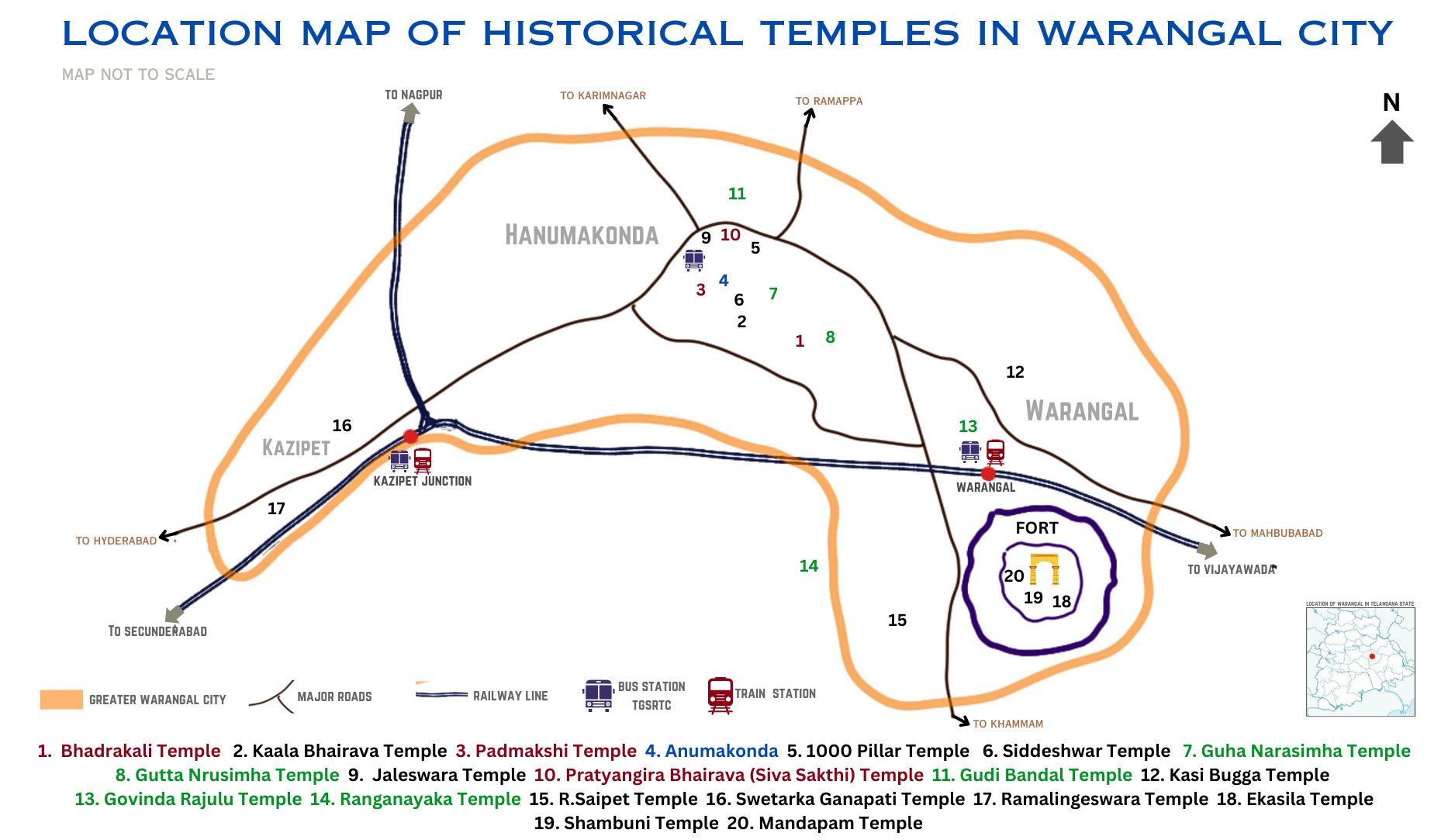
Location map of Historical Temples in Warangal
