= Ripponpet =

Town in Karnataka, India

Coordinates: 13.987°N 75.261°E

Ripponpeté is a small town in Hosanagara Taluk, Shivamogga district, Karnataka, India. It is center point of four taluks: Shimoga, Sagara, Thirthahalli, and Hosanagara. The town is a gateway to the Malenadu (Malnad) region of India and named after George Robinson, 1st Marquess of Ripon.

== See also ==
- Kunchikal Falls
- Varahi River
- Agumbe
