= Dharaṇendra =

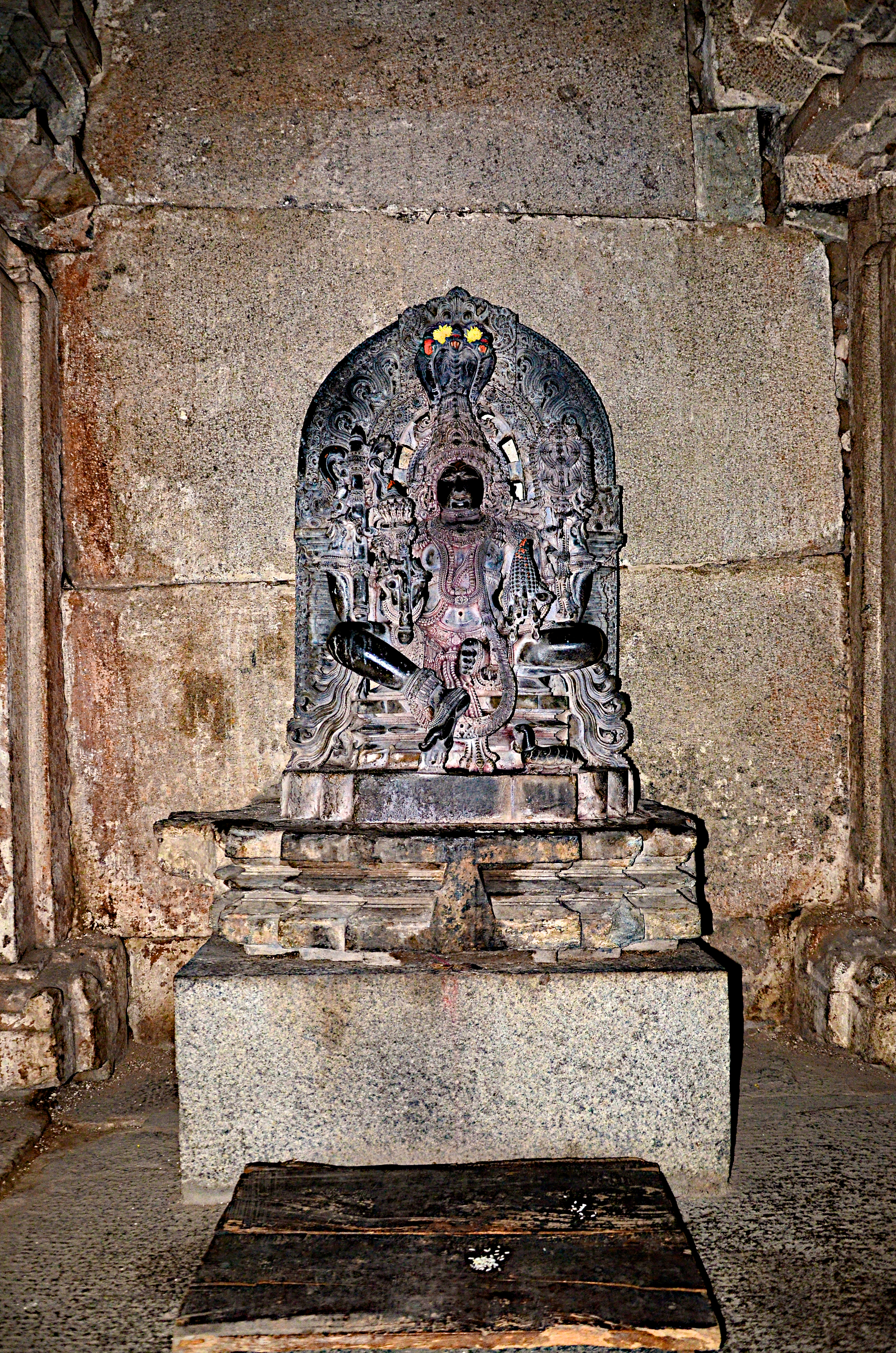
- A sculpture of Yaksha Dharanendra at Akkana Basadi, Shravanabelagola
- Affiliation: Yaksha of Parshvanatha
- Consort: Padmavati

Dharaṇendra is the Yaksha (attendant deity and protective god) or śāsana devatā of Parshvanatha, the twenty-third Tirthankara in Jainism. He enjoys an independent religious life and is very popular amongst Jains. According to the Digambara Jain tradition, when Pārśvanātha was a prince, he saved two snakes (a nāga and a nāgina) that had been trapped in a log in the ritual fire of a sorcerer named Kamaṭha. Later, these snakes were reborn as Dharaṇendra, the lord (ruler) of the underworld Nāgaloka, and Padmavati (as his consort). They then sheltered ascetic Pārśvanātha when he was harassed by Meghalin (Kamaṭha’s reborn).

The Śvetāmbara tradition does not list Padmāvatī among the queens of Dharaṇendra.

Western Ganga literature states that Nāga-rāja Dharaṇendra was worshipped for acquiring sons.

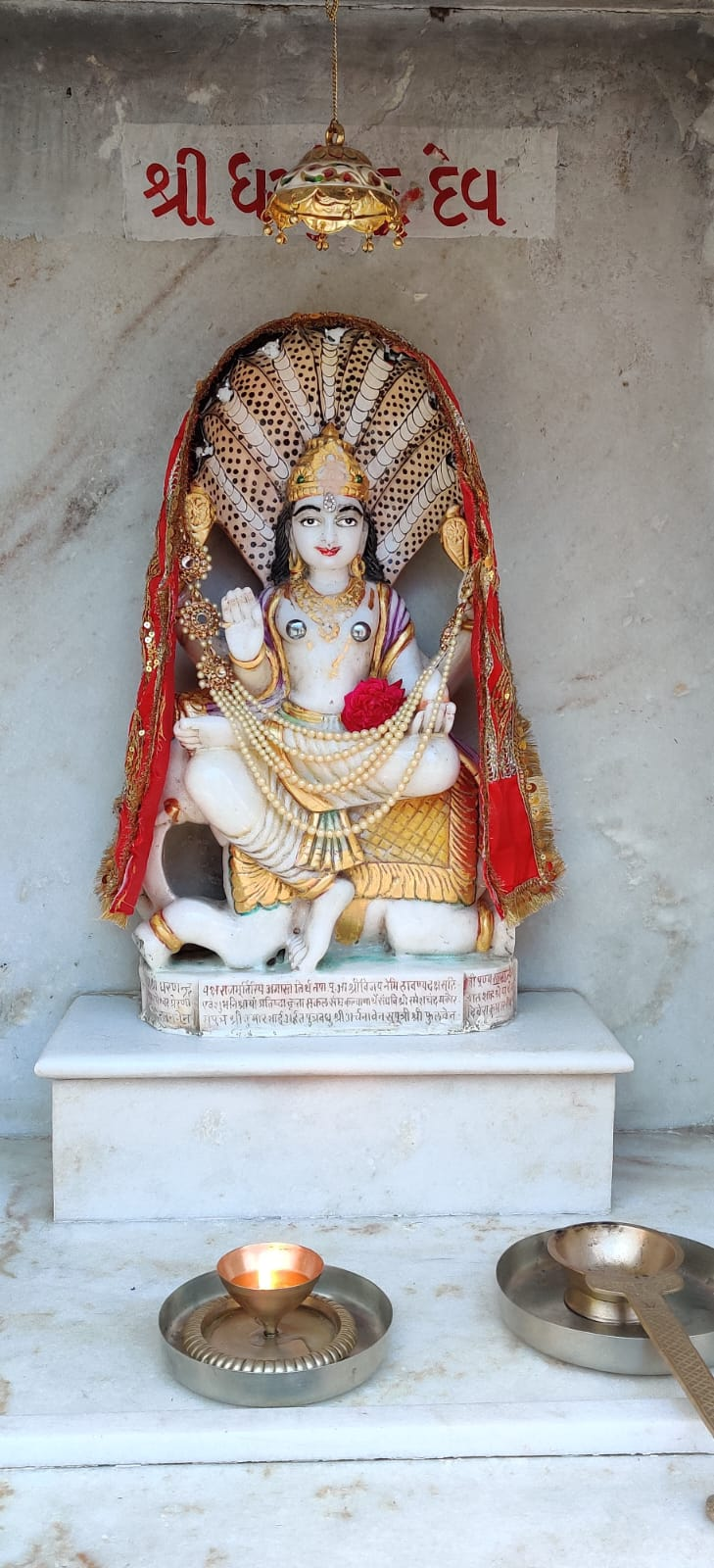
Idol of Dharaṇendra at Shree Samavasarna Śvetāmbara Maha Mandir of Aagashi, Palghar, Maharashtra.

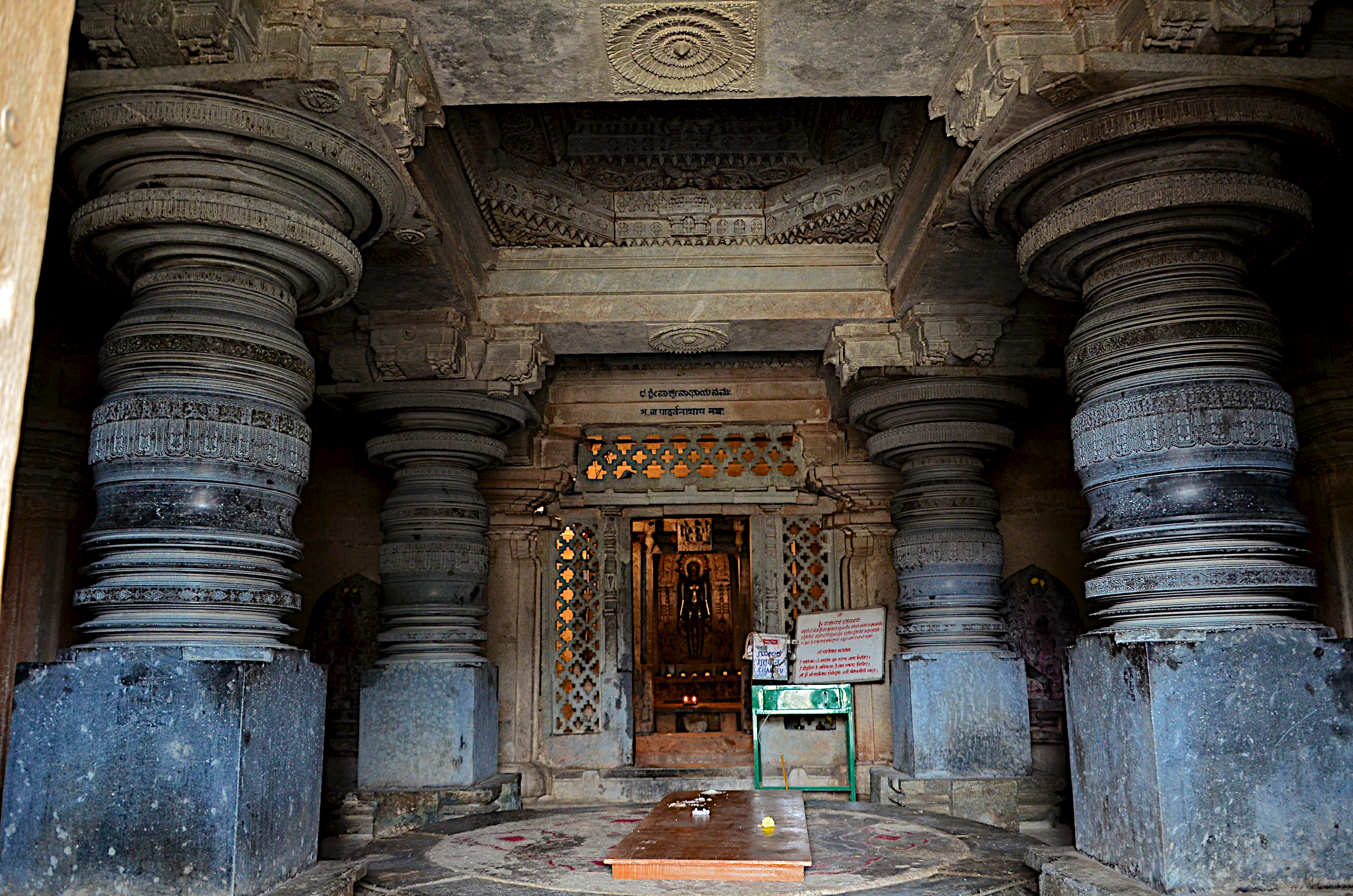
The inside view from Akkana Basadi of Shravanabelagola (1181 A.D.); Pārśvanātha (centre), Dharaṇendra (left) and Padmāvatī (right)

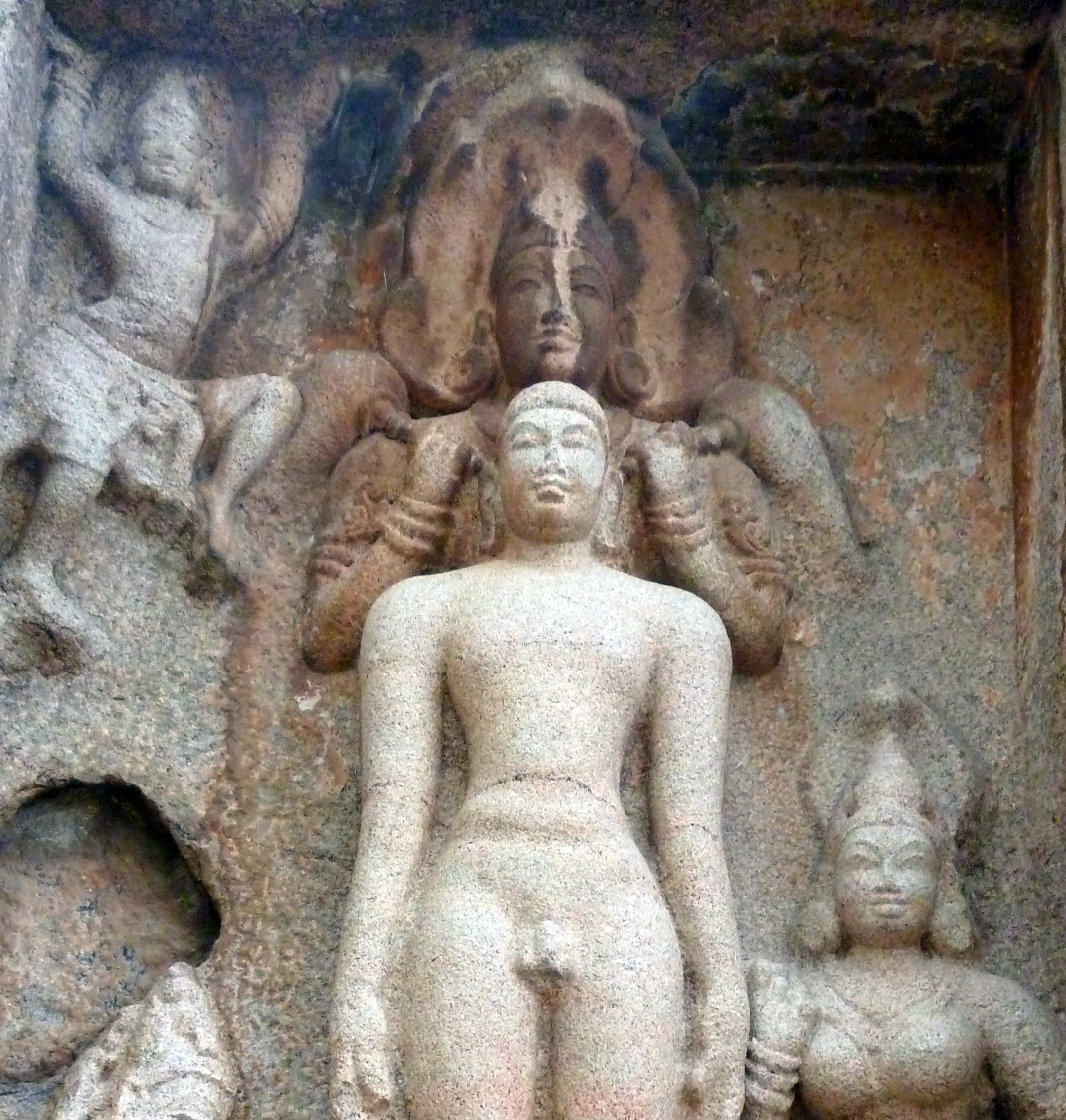
Sculpt image portraying Pārśvanātha sheltered by his yakṣa Dharaṇendra at Kalugumalai Jain Beds

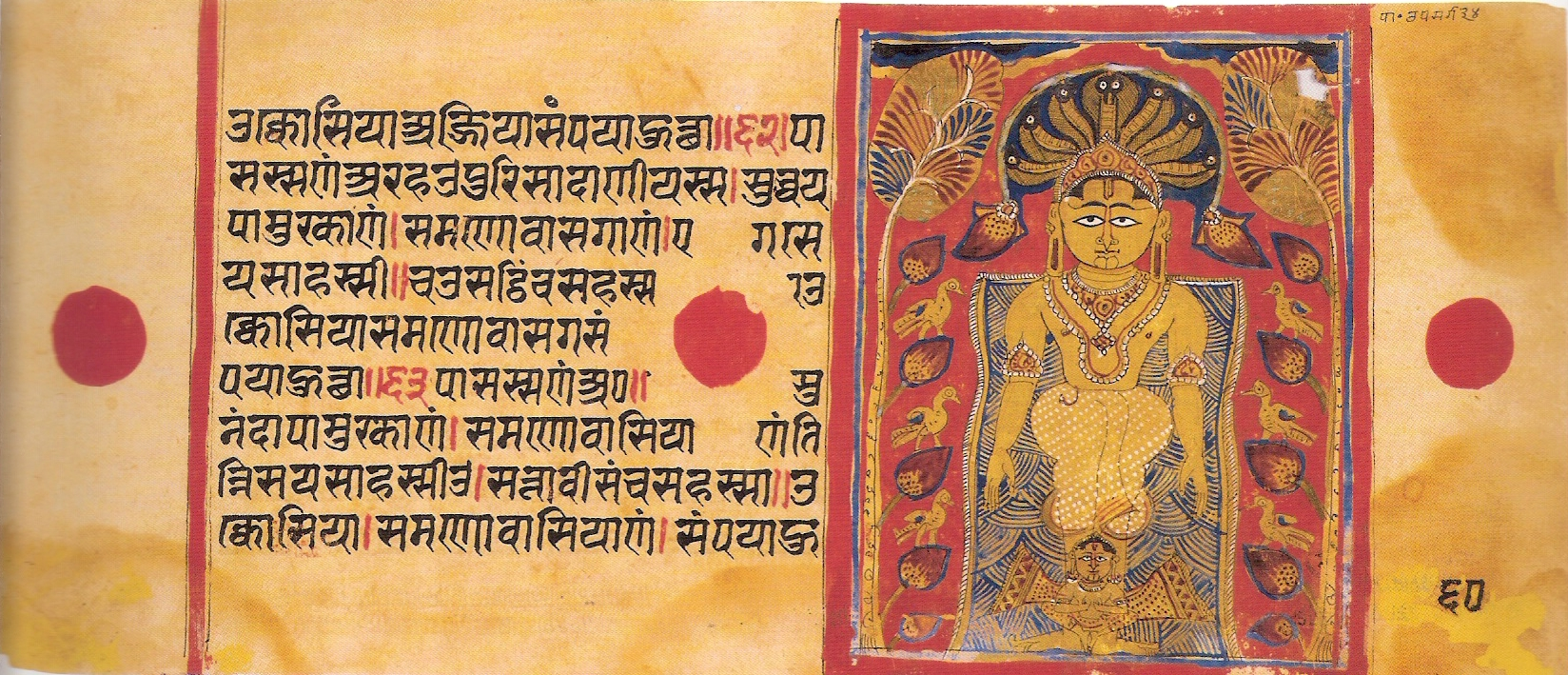
Dharaṇendra with Pārśva, Kalpa sutra (15th century)

== See also ==
- Uvasagharam Stotra
- Parshvanatha
- Padmavati (Jainism)
