= Padmāvatī =

Goddess in Jainism

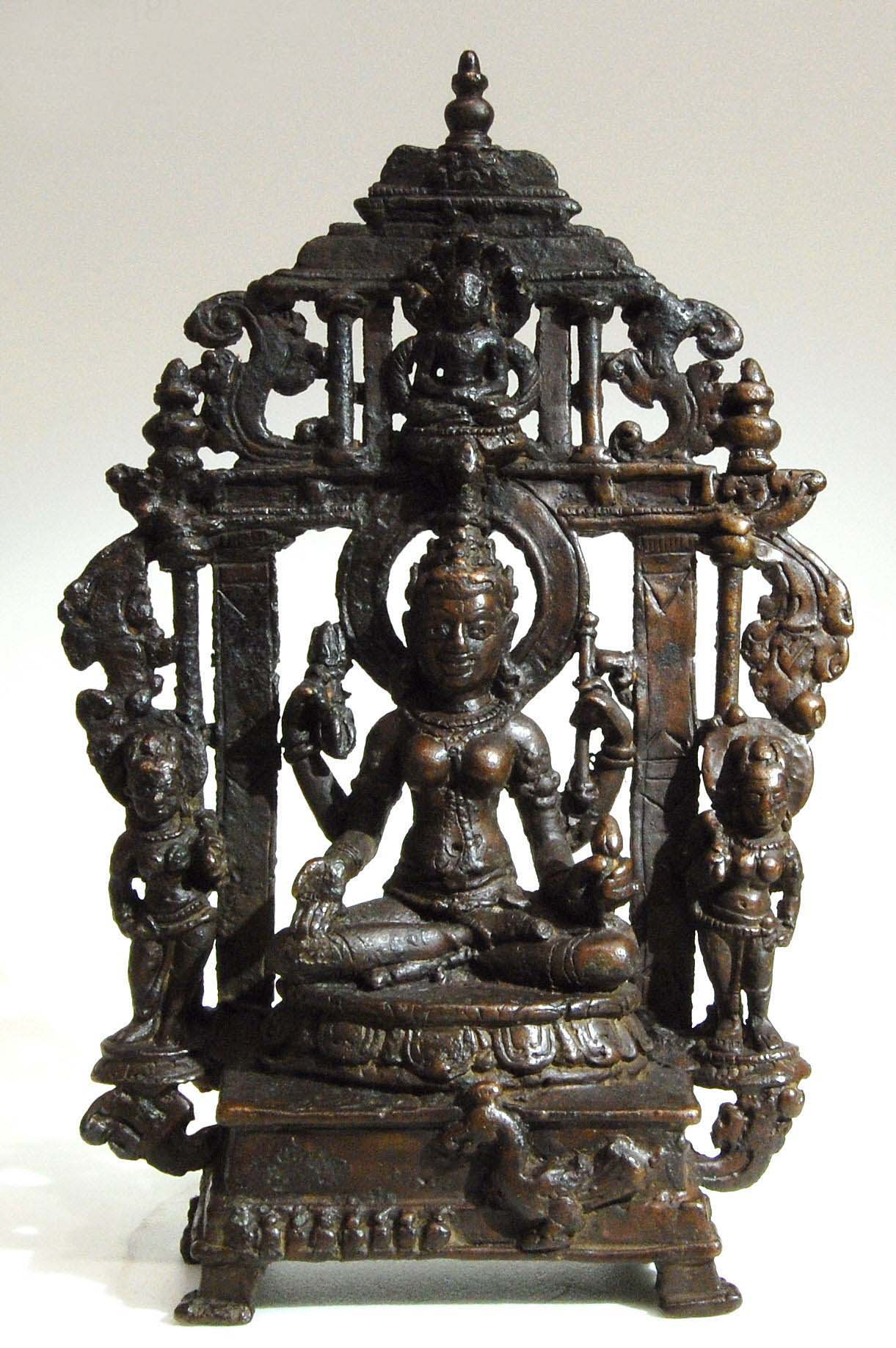
- Padmavati, 10th century, Metropolitan Museum of Art

Genealogy
- Spouse: Dharanendra

Padmāvatī is the protective goddess or śāsana devī (शासनदेवी) of Pārśvanātha, the twenty-third Jain tīrthāṅkara, complimenting Parshwa yaksha in Swetambara and Dharanendra in digambar the shasan deva. She is a yakshini (attendant goddess) of Parshwanatha.

== Jain biography ==
There is another pair of souls of a nāga and nāginī who were saved by Parshwanath while being burnt alive in a log of wood by the tapas kamath, and who were subsequently reborn as Indra (Dharanendra in particular) and Padmavati (different from sashan devi) after their death. According to the Jain tradition, Padmavati and her husband Dharanendra protected Lord Parshvanatha when he was harassed by Meghmali. After Padmavati rescued Parshvanatha grew subsequently powerful in to yakshi, a powerful tantric deity and surpassed other snake goddess Vairotya.

== Legacy ==
=== Worship ===
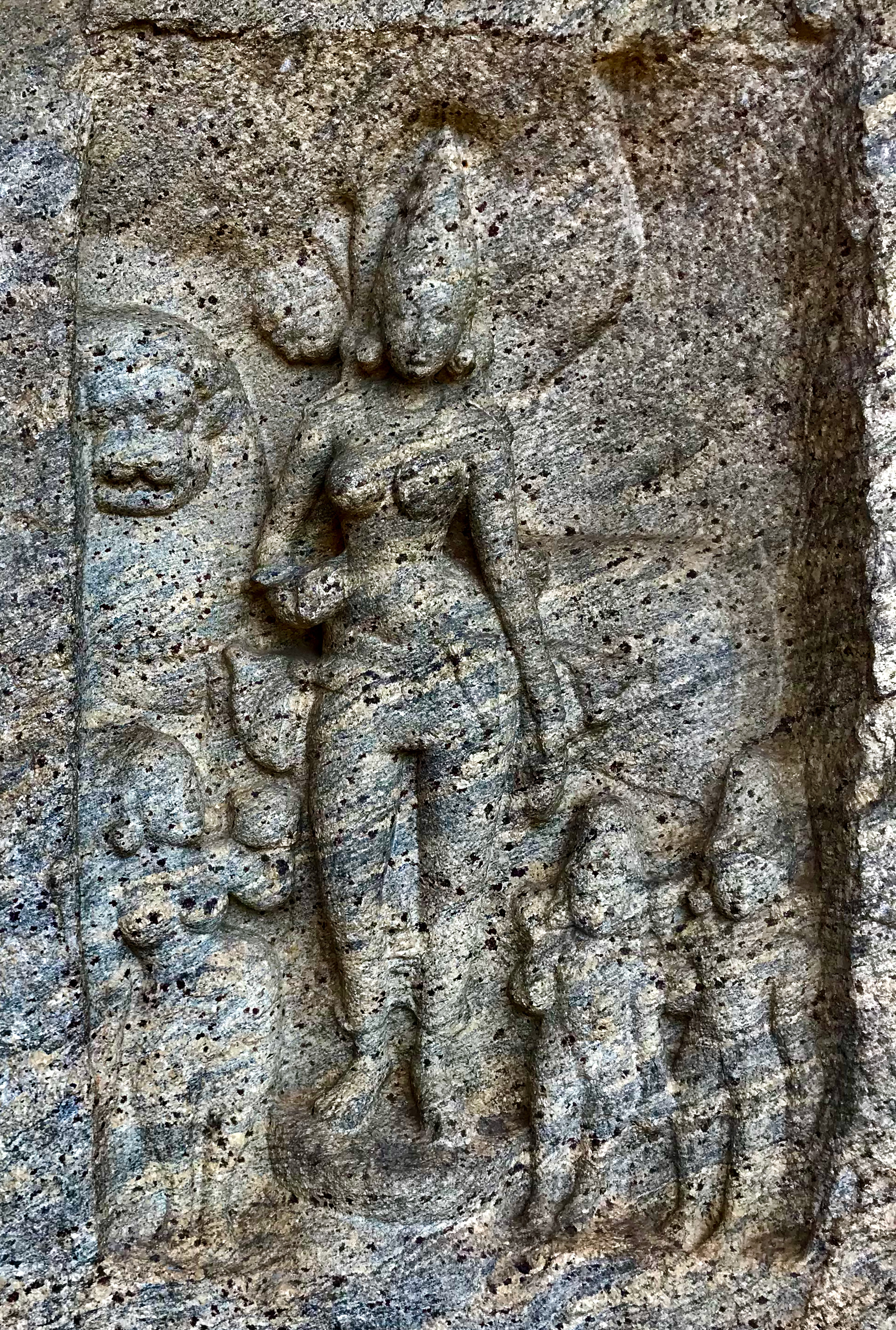
9th century Padmavati relief in Chitharal Jain Monuments

Goddess Padmavati along with Ambika and Chakreshvari are held as esteemed deities and worshipped by Jains along with tirthankaras. Ambika and Padmavati are associated with tantric rituals. Both Padmavati and Dharanendra are revered exclusively as powerful intercessor deities. These tantric rites involves yantra-vidhi, pitha-sthapana and mantra-puja. Friday of every week is a particularly popular day to worship the Goddess.

=== In literature ===
- Bhairava-Padmavati-Kalpa written by Mallisena in 12th century is tantric text to worship Padmavati. The text discusses rites connected with Padmavati, namely, stambha, vasya, akarsana, nimitta-jnana, garuda tantra etc.
- Adbhuta-Padmavati-Kalpa is Śvetāmbara text composed by Shri Chandra Suri, 12th century.
- Padmavati-astaka composed by Śvetāmbara scholar Parshvadeva gani is commentary of various tantric rites.
- Padmavati-catusadika composed by Jinaprabha suri.
- Padmavati-Pujanama, Padmavati-strota, Padmavati-sahasra-nama-strota, Rakta-Padmavati-Kalpa are tantric text dedicated to Padmavati.

=== Iconography ===
A snake's hood covers her head, and she sits on a lotus flower. Often a small image of Parshvanatha is placed in her crown. She may be depicted as four-armed, carrying noose and rosary (japa mala), elephant goad, lotus and a fruit. Her mount, or vahana, is the rooster. Yaksha-Yakshi pair sculptures of Padmavati Ambika and Dharanendra are one of the most favoured along with Gomukha-Chakreshwari and Sarvahanabhuti-Ambika.

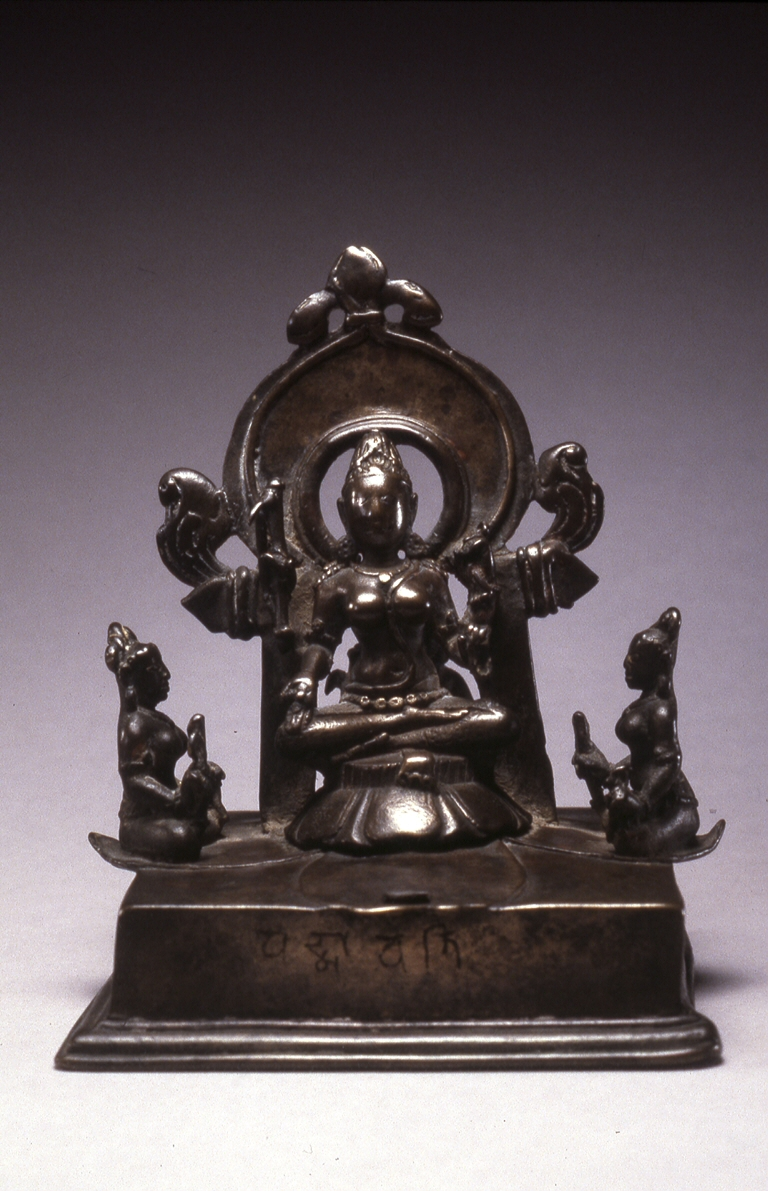
'Mandala of Padmavati', bronze, Walters Art Museum, 11th century

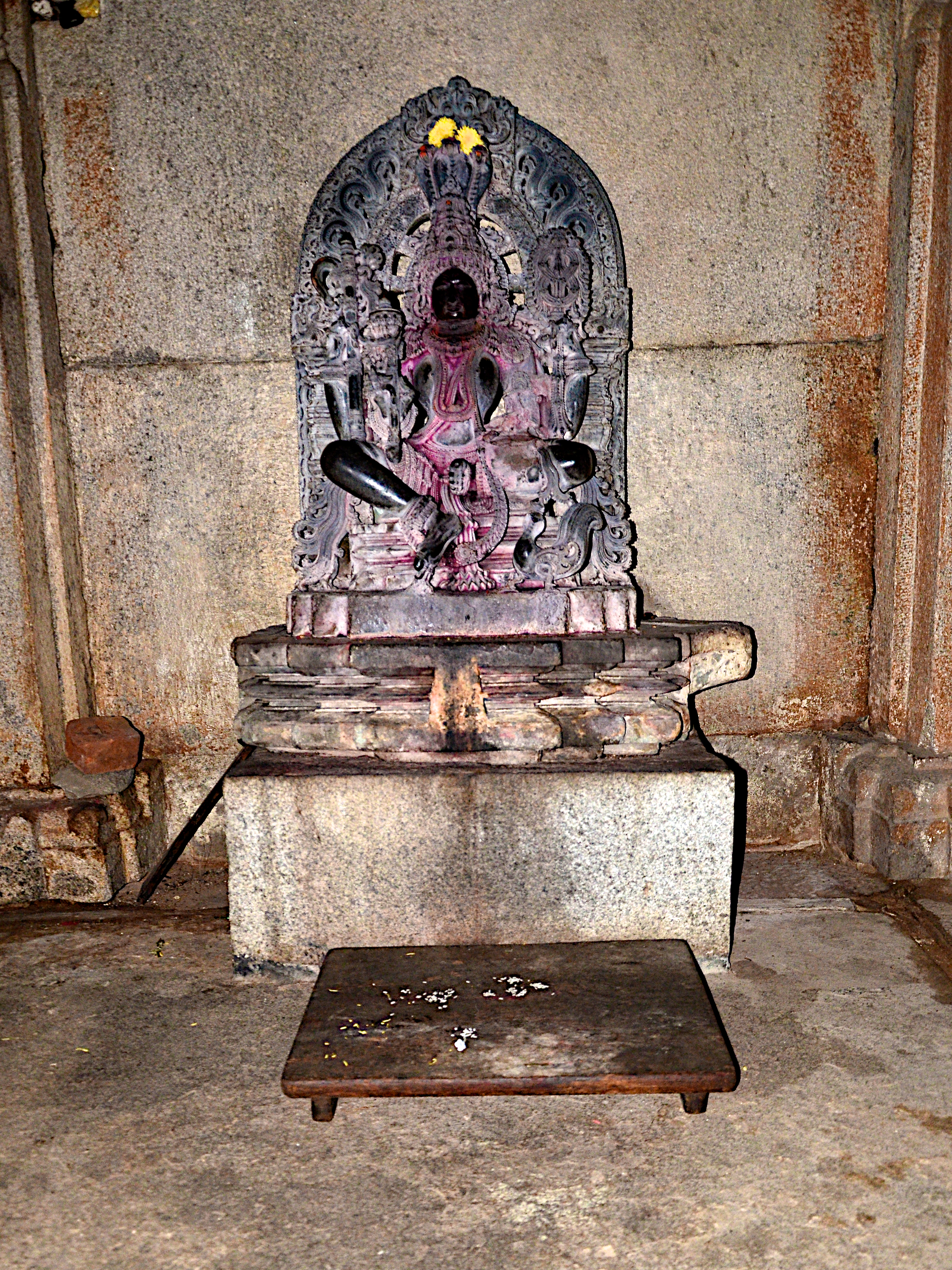
Sculpture of Goddess Padmavati in Akkana Basadi, 12th century

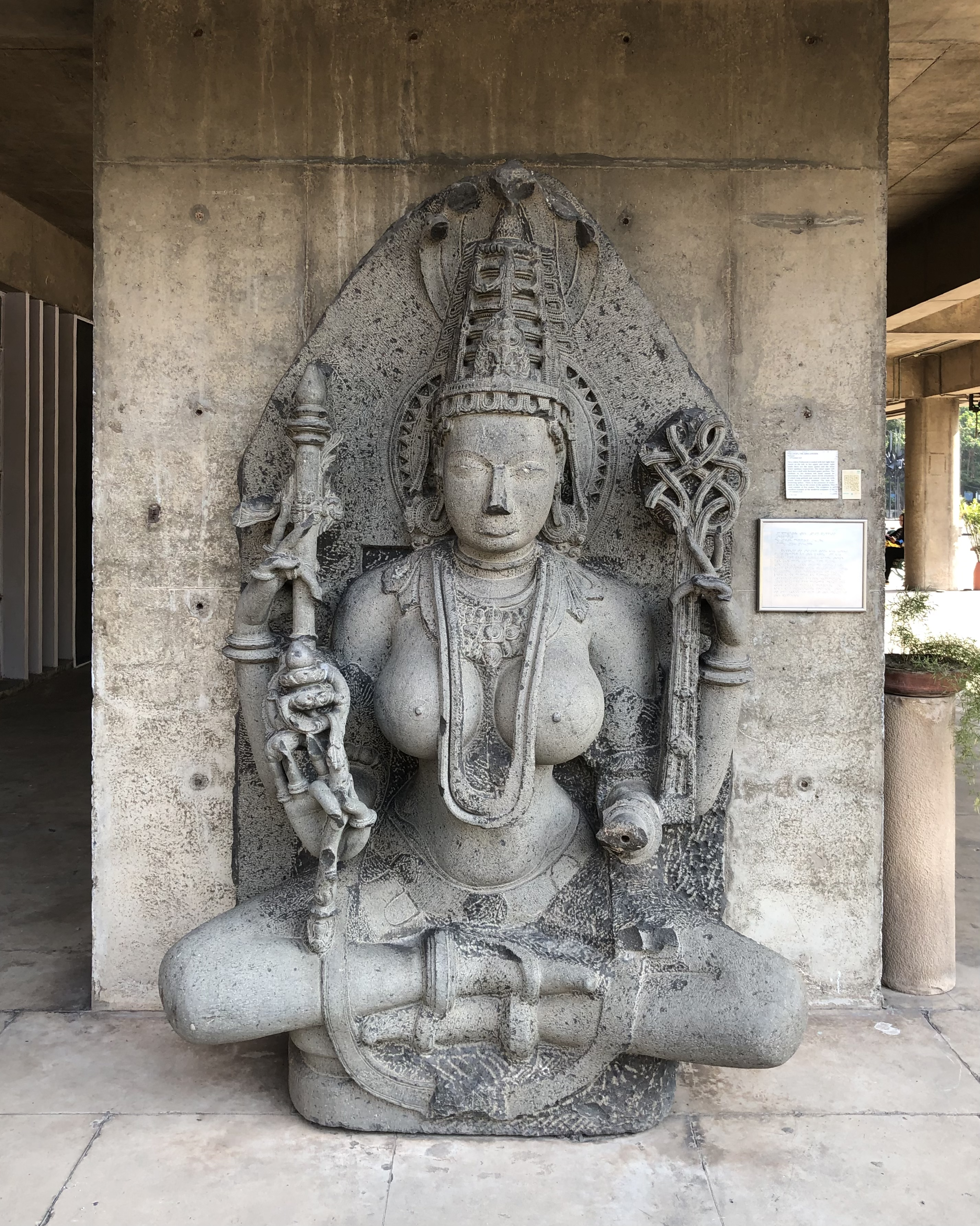
Sculpture of Padmavati in the Government Museum and Art Gallery, Chandigarh. Chola dynasty, 13th century

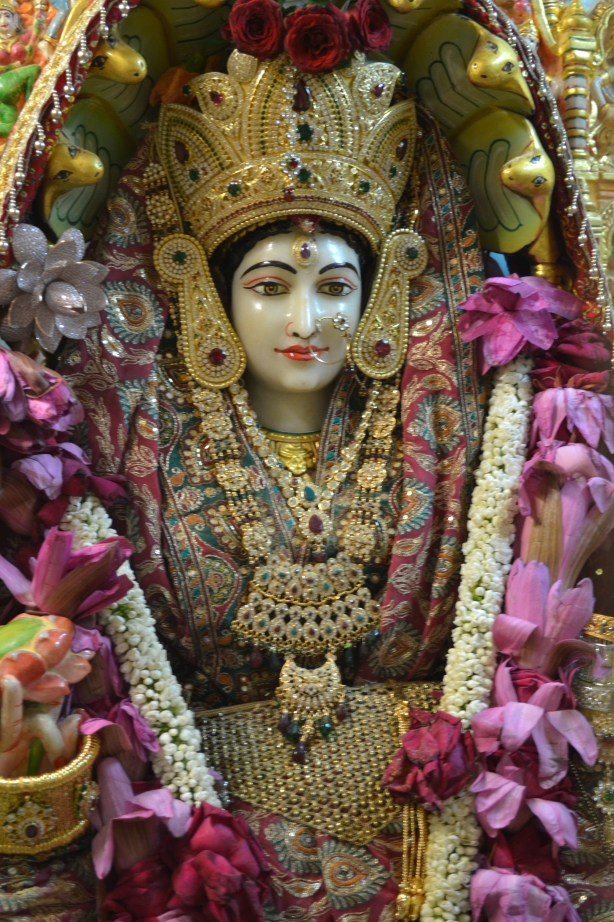
Goddess Padmavati at Walkeshwar Jain Temple

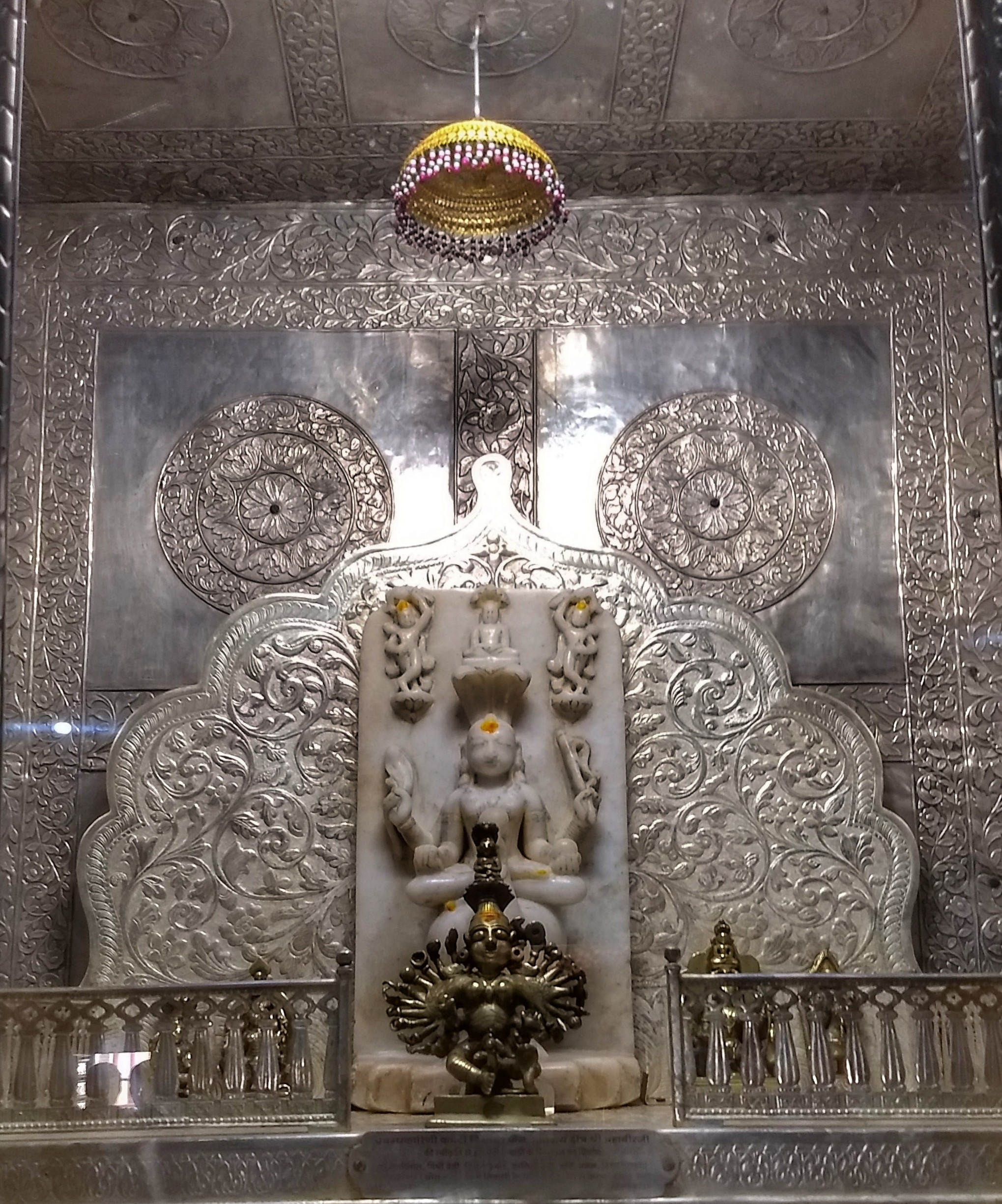
Padmavati at Shri Mahavirji

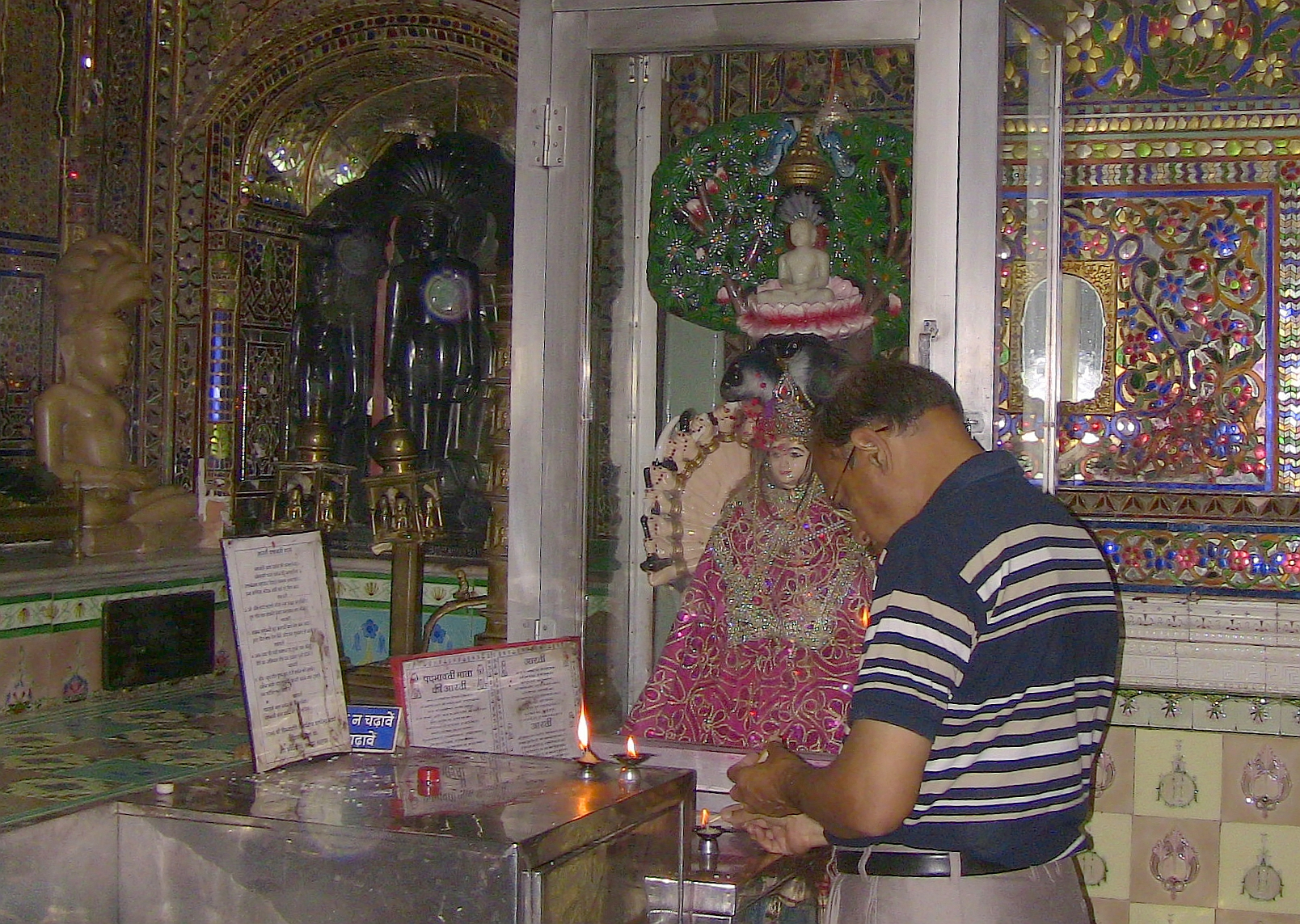
Goddess Padmavati at Hanumantal Bada Jain Mandir, Jabalpur

=== Main temples ===
- Padmakshi Gutta in Warangal, Telangana
- Padmavati temple, Humcha, 7th century temple
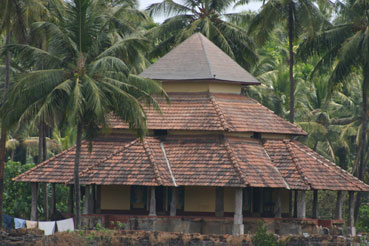
Padmavati Basadi, Karkala, Karnataka

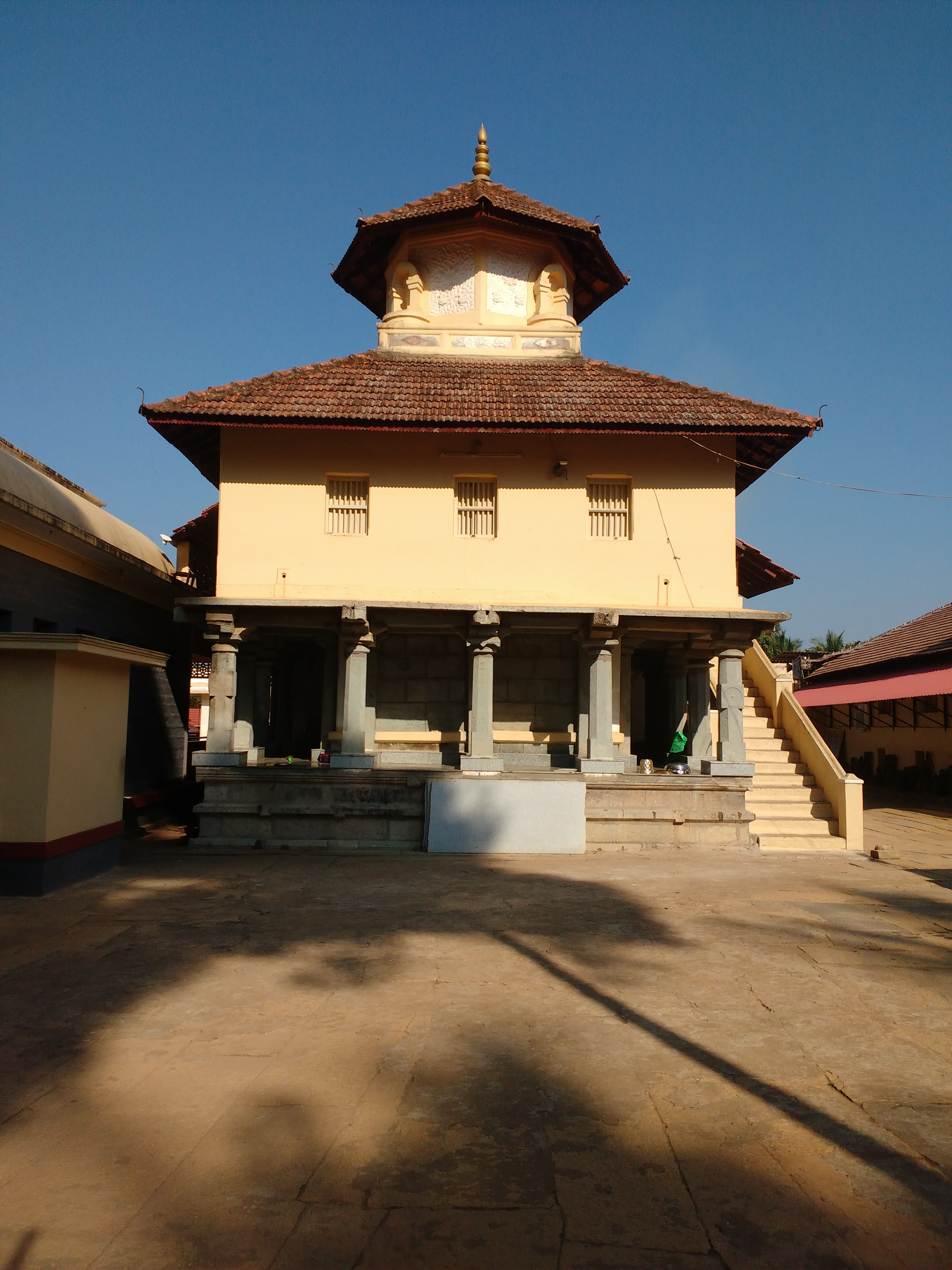
Padmavati temple, Humcha

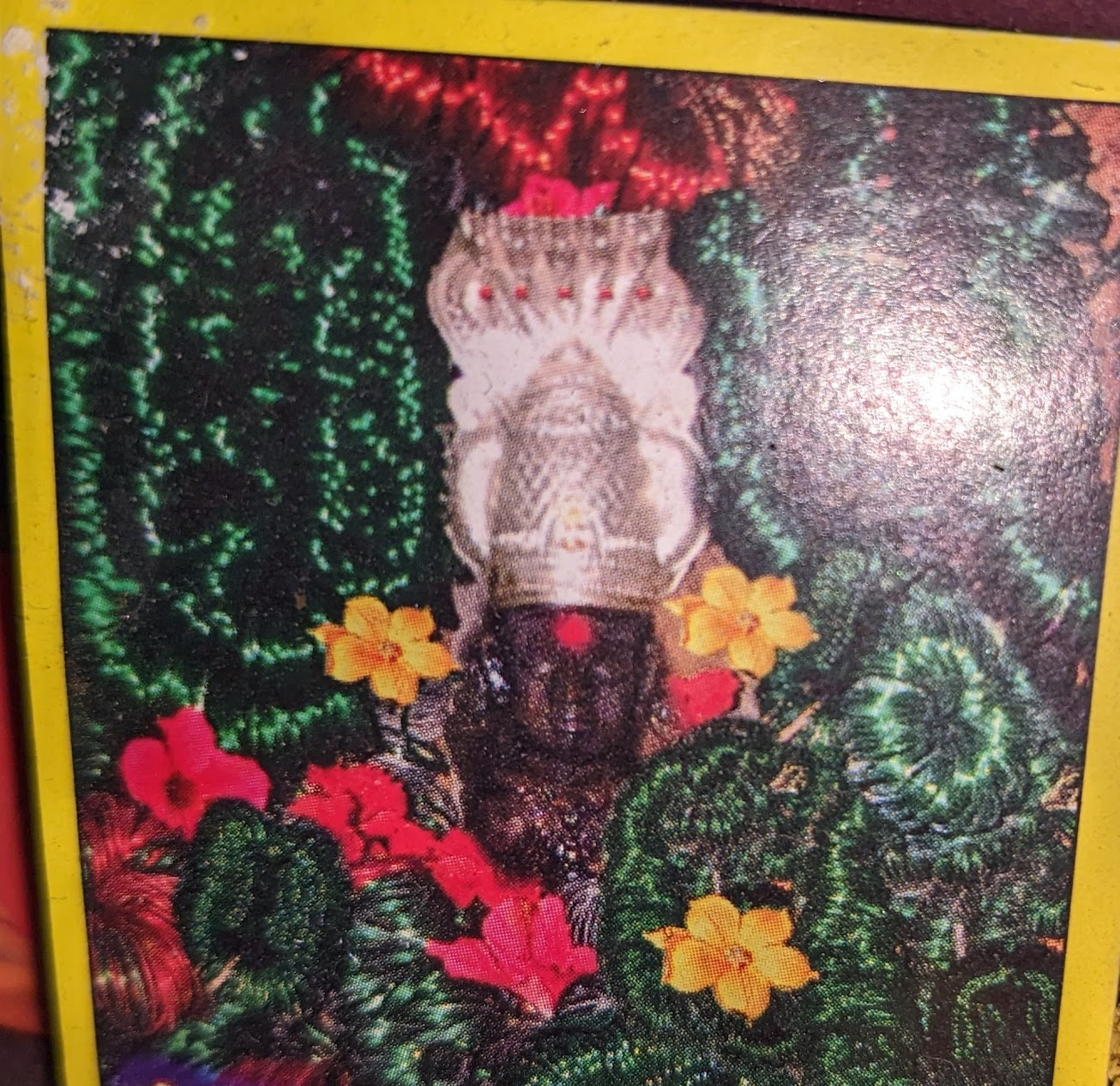
Bale Padmavati Temple, Padmavati Temple Vadanbilu, jog falls Karnataka

== See also ==
- Humcha
- Hanumantal Bada Jain Mandir
