= Kareemabad, Telangana =

Kareemabad
- Tri-city
- Location in Telangana, India Kareemabad (India)
- Coordinates: 17.960016208455134°N 79.59357451647519°E
- Country: India
- State: Telangana
- District: Hanamkonda district

Government
  - Type: Municipal council
  - Body: Greater Warangal Municipal Corporation

Languages
  - Official: Telugu
- Time zone: UTC+5:30 (IST)
- PIN: 506 xxx
- Telephone code: +91–870
- Vehicle registration: TS–03

Kareemabad is a part of Warangal Tri-city or Warangal City in the Indian state of Telangana. It is located amidst Kazipet and Warangal.
