= Kadipikonda =

- Village
- Location in Telangana, India
- Coordinates: 17.96376°N 79.5055454°E
- Mandal: Kazipet
- District: Hanamkonda district
- State: Telangana
- Country: India

Government
  - Body: GWMC

Languages
  - Official: Telugu
- Time zone: UTC+5:30 (IST)
- PIN: 506 003
- Telephone code: 0870
- Vehicle registration: TS
- Nearest city: Warangal

Kadipikonda is a municipal corporation of 44 & 45th Division in Hanamkonda district, Telangana, India. It is located near the Kazipet railway junction.

== Demographics of Kadipikonda ==
Telugu is the Local Language here. The total population of Kadipikonda (CT) is 8,685 according to census 2011. Among them Males are 4,313 and Females are 4,372 living in Houses. Of these, 5,965 are literate. There are 806 children below 6 years. All the numbers are according to the 2011 census.

== Transport ==
=== Rail ===
Kazipet Jn Rail Way Station, Kazipet Town Rail Way Station are the very nearby railway stations to Kadipikonda.

== Education ==
Colleges near Kadipikonda

Pulipatiprasad Ovc Jr College Address : 1-8-524/3 Kandi Complex Opp:s.b.h Nakkalagutta Hanamkonda Sri Arunodaya Coop Jr Col Hanamkonda Address : Govt Pingali Women's Jr Col Hanamkonda Address : St Joseph S Girls Jr Coll Hanamkonda Address : Sri Vikas Jr Clg, vijayatalkies Rd, hanamkonda Address : Vijayatalkies Rd;hanamkonda Schools in Kadipikonda

St. George High School Address : Kadipikonda, Hanamkonda, Warangal, Telangana. PIN- 506003, Post - Kazipet

Viswashanti High School Address : Kadipikonda, Hanamkonda, Warangal, Telangana. PIN- 506003, Post - Kazipet

Zphs Kadipikonda Address : Kadipikonda, Hanamkonda, Warangal, Telangana. PIN- 506003, Post - Kazipet

Universal Innovative School Address : Kadipikonda, Hanamkonda, Warangal, Telangana. PIN- 506003, Post - Kazipet

Sri Vivekananda Ups Address : Kadipikonda, Hanamkonda, Warangal, Telangana. PIN- 506003, Post - Kazipet
