= Gutta (disambiguation) =

A gutta is a small water-repelling projection used in classical architecture.

Gutta may also refer to:

== Entertainment ==
- Gutta (album), the debut studio album by American rapper Ace Hood
- Gutta Mixx, an album by rapper Bushwick Bill
- Gutta på tur, a Norwegian travel-TV show

== Medicine and biology ==
- Gutta-percha, trees of the genus Palaquium and the rigid natural latex produced from the sap of these trees
- Drop (unit) or guttae in Latin

== Places in India ==
- Chandrayan Gutta, a suburb in Hyderabad, India
- Govinda Rajula Gutta, a historical place in Telangana, India
- Jagathgiri Gutta, a colony and a ward in Telangana, India
- Doli Gutta, a mountain peak in the northern part of the Deccan Plateau in India

== Other ==
- Gutta (name), an Indian surname
