= Warangal Hyderabad push pull passenger =

Warangal Hyderabad Warangal push pull passenger, is a suburban service running between Warangal and Hyderabad in the Telangana state. The Secundrabad Division of South Central Railways of Indian Railways administers this train. The train covers 151 kilometres (94 mi) in 3 hours and 55 minutes.

The train runs from Warangal to Hyderabad, the capital of Telangana state.

It has daily two services between the Warangal to Hyderabad.

== Numbers ==
The rake composition is 12 coach train with engines at both ends.

First Service Timings

- 67265 (Up) Warangal- Hyderabad Push-pull Passenger
- 67264 (Down) Hyderabad-Warangal Push-pull Passenger

Second Service Timings

- 67267 (Up) Warangal- Hyderabad Push-pull Passenger
- 67266 (Down) Hyderabad-Kazipet Push-pull Passenger
