= Kakatiya Musical Garden =

Park in Hanamakonda, India

- Location within Telangana
- Location: Hanumakonda, Warangal, Telangana
- Nearest city: Warangal
- Coordinates: 17°59′27″N 79°35′19″E
- Area: 18 acres (73,000 m^{2})

Kakatiya Musical Garden is a musical garden located near the Bhadrakali temple in Warangal, Telangana.

The garden was established in 1994 and it covers an area of 18 acres (73,000 m^{2}). The main attraction of the garden is a musical water fountain with the perfect synchronization of colourful lights.

Including TSRTC, many private services provide a very good transport facility to the garden. The nearest railway station is Warangal railway station, which is 4 km away from the garden.
