= Saint Gabriel's College =

Saint Gabriel's College may refer to:

- Saint Gabriel's College (Thailand), private boys' school in Bangkok, Thailand
- Saint Gabriel's College (school in Camberwell), co-educational secondary school in Camberwell, London, England
- St Gabriel's College (teacher training college), former teacher training college, also in Camberwell, from 1899 to 1977
- St. Gabriel College, Quito, private school in Quito, Ecuador

== See also ==
- St. Gabriel's Secondary School, Serangoon, Singapore
- St. Gabriel's High School, Kazipet, India
- St Gabriel's Roman Catholic High School, Bury, Greater Manchester, England
- St Gabriel's School, Sandleford, England
