= Shah Afzal Biabani =

Indian mystic

Syed Shah Afzal Biabani
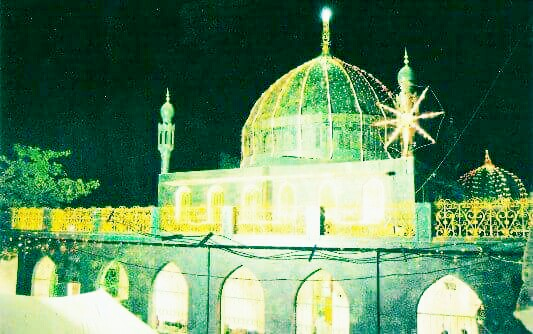
- Dada Peer
- Title: Biabani

Personal life
- Born: 1795
- Died: 1856 (aged 60–61)
- Era: Modern era
- Region: Hyderabad Deccan Now Telangana
- Main interest(s): Aqeedah, Fiqh, Tasawwuf

Religious life
- Religion: Islam
- Jurisprudence: Hanafi
- Creed: Sunni

Muslim leader
- Influenced by: Abdul Qadir Jilani and Syed Shah Ghulam Mohiuddin Biabani
- Influenced: Syed Shah Sarwar Biabani, Syed Shah Ghulam Afzal Biyabani, Many Khalifas,

Syed Shah Afzal Biabani (1795 – 1856 A.D / 1210 – 26 Safar, 1272 AH) was a Sufi from Warangal, Hyderabad State (now Kazipet 132 km from Hyderabad, India). He was appointed as Kazi of Warangal during the reign of Nizam Ali Khan (Asaf Jah II). His dargah is among the pilgrimage centers of Warangal, Telangana, drawing crowds of Muslims, Hindus, Christians, and Sikhs until the present day.

The word "Biabani" is a plural of the Urdu and Persian word "Biaban" which means soonsan (in Urdu) and 'uninhabited place' in English. He received this nickname after spending 12 years in Tasawwuf (a form of Sufi meditation) in the caves located in the forest of Battupalli near Kazipet.

== Dargah ==
His shrine (Dargah) at Kazipet is 2 km from Kazipet railway station in Warangal District. Pilgrims from many religions come from around the world to attend the three-day urs celebrations every year, beginning on 26 Safar (second month of the Islamic calendar).

== See also ==
- Nizam of Hyderabad – Historic monarch of the Hyderabad State of India
- Nizam Ali Khan – Nizam of Hyderabad from 1762 to 1803 Asaf Jah II
