= Doreen Kuper =

Entrepreneur from Solomon Islands

- Citizenship: Solomon Islands
- Known for: Honorary Consul to New Zealand; Chair of the Festival of Pacific Arts
- Spouse: Richard Prebble

Doreen Kuper is an entrepreneur and cultural mediator from the Solomon Islands. She is a former Honorary Consul of Solomon Islands to New Zealand and a former Chair of the Festival of Pacific Arts.

== Biography ==
Educated at the Melanesian Mission's St. Mary's School in Pamua, in 1962 she was awarded one of three scholarships to fund overseas secondary education. She attended St Gabriel's College, Waverley. In 1992, she was appointed the Solomon Islands Honorary Consul to New Zealand.

In the 2006 general elections she contested the seat of East Makira, but was unsuccessful - the fact she was not resident in the constituency made campaigning difficult. In 2010, as part of her role as consul, she launched the book Being the First, which is the first publication to feature the stories and experiences of women from the Solomon Islands, in their own words. She later launched the anthology in New Zealand.

Kuper is a former Chair of the Festival of Pacific Arts, which was held in the Solomon Islands in 2012. The festival attracted an audience of 200,000 people, with 3,000 performers from twenty-four countries taking part. During her time as chair, she led calls for the repatriation of art and artefacts to the Solomon Islands from non-Pacific countries. Her cultural leadership also enabled the Solomon Islands to host the Miss Pacific Pageant in 2013.

In 2021, she was a guest speaker at a festival in Honiara celebrating the people of Makira.
