= Warangal Tri-City =

Kazipeta-Hanamkonda-Warangal
- Tri-City
- Location within Telangana Location within India
- Coordinates: 18.0167°N 79.6333°E
- Country: India
- State: Telangana

Government
  - Type: Mayor-council
  - Body: GWMC; KUDA
  - Mayor: Gunda Prakash Rao
  - Municipal Commissioner: N.Ravi Kiran
  - Commissioner of Police: Sudheer Babu

Languages
  - Official: Telugu
- Time zone: UTC+5:30 (IST)
- PIN: 506001 to 506019
- Telephone code: +91–870
- Vehicle registration: TG–03, TG-24
- Ethnicity: Indian
- Website: www.gwmc.gov.in

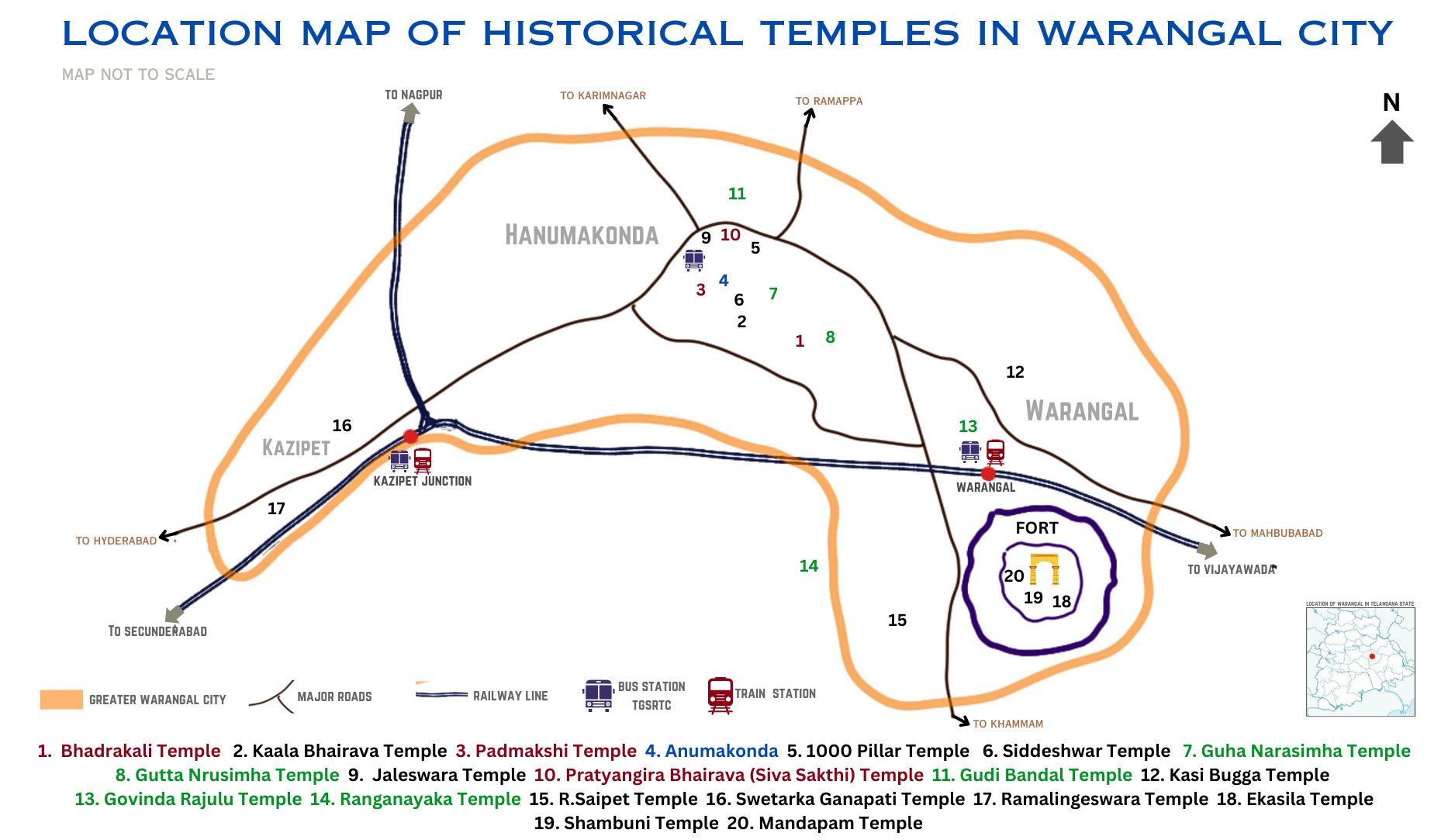
Location map of Historical Temples in Warangal

The three urban cities Kazipet, Hanamkonda and Warangal are together known as Warangal Tri-City. The three cities are connected by National Highway 163. The major stations are Kazipet Junction railway station and Warangal railway station.
