= Waddepally Lake =

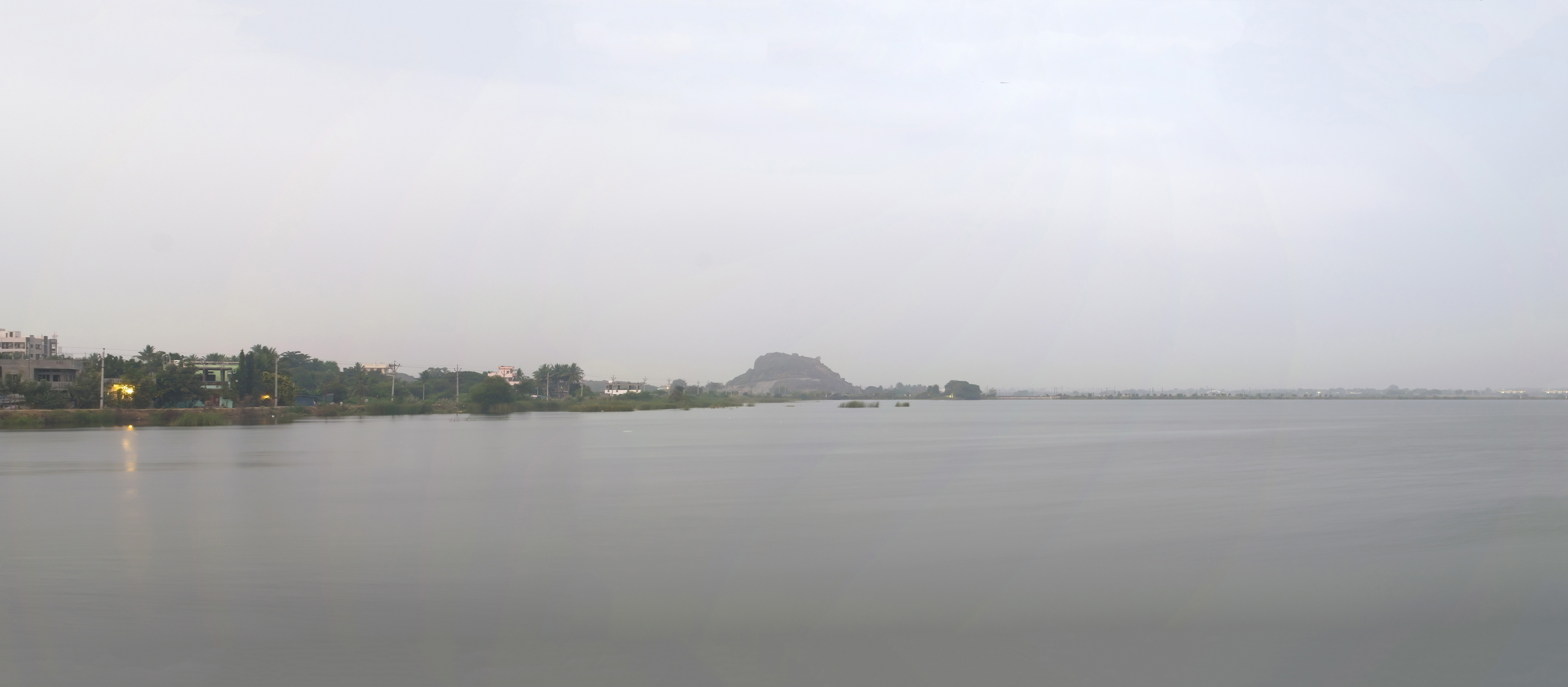
- Waddepally lake in Warangal

- Location within Telangana
- Location: Hanamkonda, Telangana
- Coordinates: 17.993662°N 79.520878°E
- Type: Reservoir
- Basin countries: India
- Frozen: No

Waddepally Lake is a lake situated in Hanamkonda, Telangana.

The lake serves as a reservoir for drinking needs Hanamkonda and Kazipet.

== Tourist spot ==
The beautification work of the lake's bund is being developed to aim at attracting tourists to the place. it is also a best spot for fishing. and it is located near a shiva temple. govt of Telangana recognised it and made it into a reservoir. now it pumps water for the city
