= Bhadrakali Lake =

Indian lake in Telangana

- భద్రకాళి చెరువుు (Telugu)
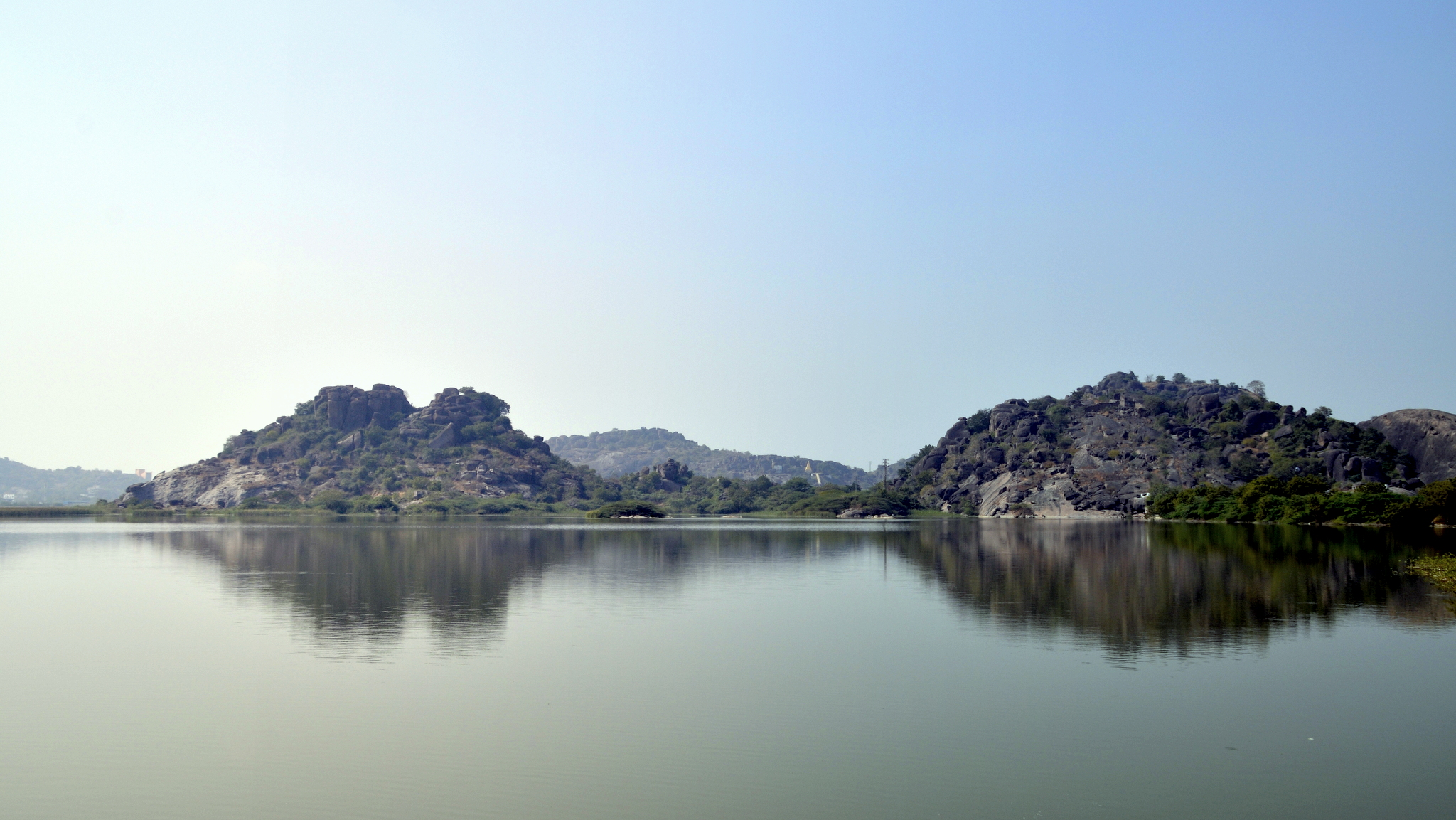

- Location within Telangana
- Location: Warangal, Telangana
- Coordinates: 17.9949°N 79.582°E
- Type: Artificial
- Basin countries: India
- Frozen: No
- Settlements: Warangal

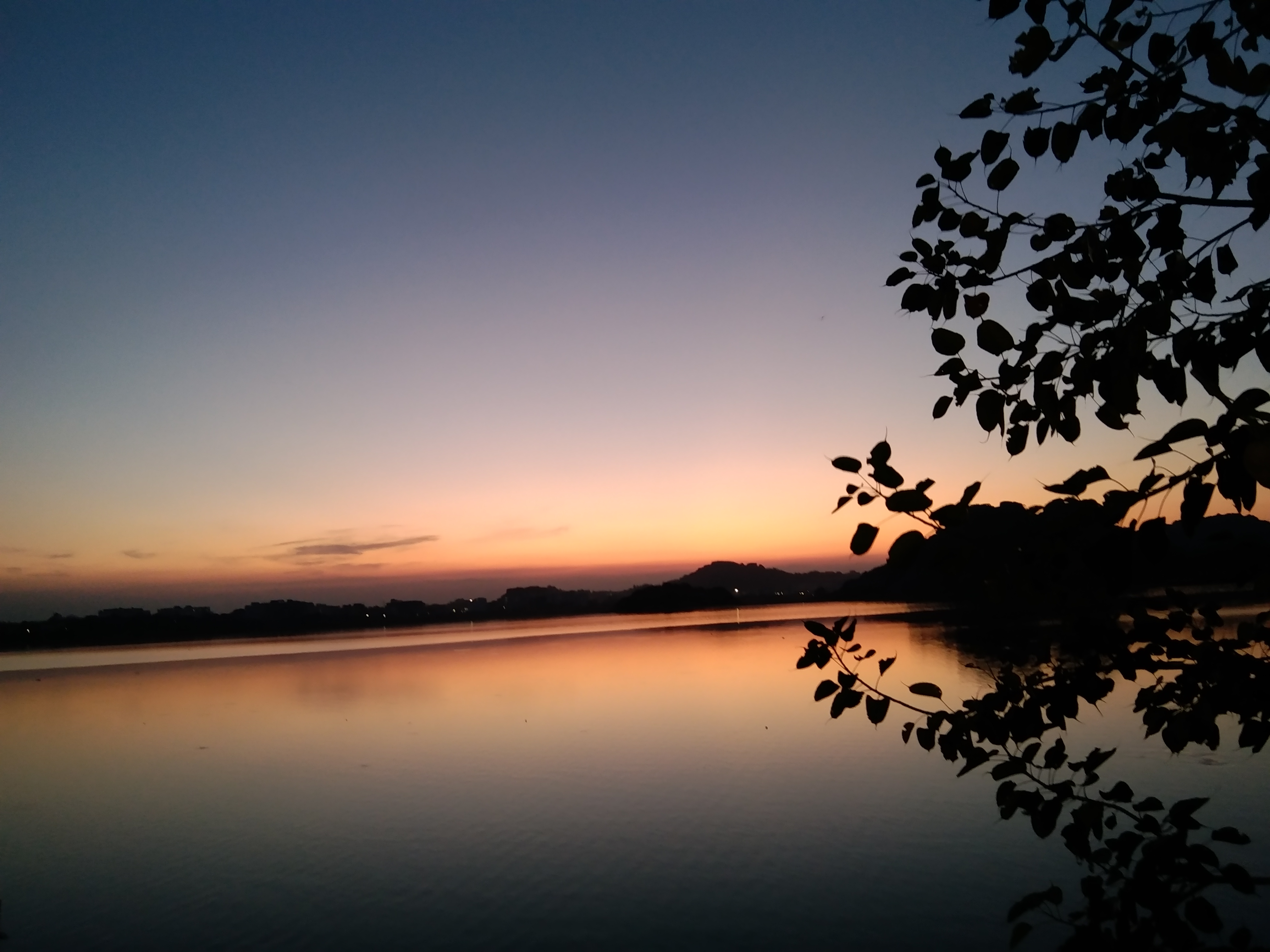
Bhadrakali lake

Bhadrakali Lake is a lake in Warangal, Telangana built by Ganapati of Kakatiya dynasty. The lake is situated near the famous Bhadrakali Temple.

== History ==
It was built by Ganapati Deva of Kakatiya dynasty.

== Tourism ==
The lake is being developed into the largest Geo-Biodiversity Cultural Park – with promenades, historic caves, suspension bridges, natural trails, nesting ground and ecological reserves. Funds have also been sanctioned for strengthening the lake bund, under the HRIDAY scheme. However in recent years the lake has begun to dry due to the urbanization of Warangal
