= Makira honeyeater =

Conservation status
- Least Concern (IUCN 3.1)

Scientific classification
- Kingdom: Animalia
- Phylum: Chordata
- Class: Aves
- Order: Passeriformes
- Family: Meliphagidae
- Genus: Meliarchus; Salvadori, 1880
- Species: M. sclateri

Binomial name
- Meliarchus sclateri (Gray, GR, 1870)

Synonyms
- Melidectes sclateri

Species of bird

The Makira honeyeater (Meliarchus sclateri), also known as the San Cristobal honeyeater, is a species of bird in the family Meliphagidae. It is endemic to Makira in the Solomon Islands.
