= Stuyvenberg Rural Training Centre =

Rural vocational training centre in Solomon Islands

Coordinates: 10°33′04″S 161°49′41″E

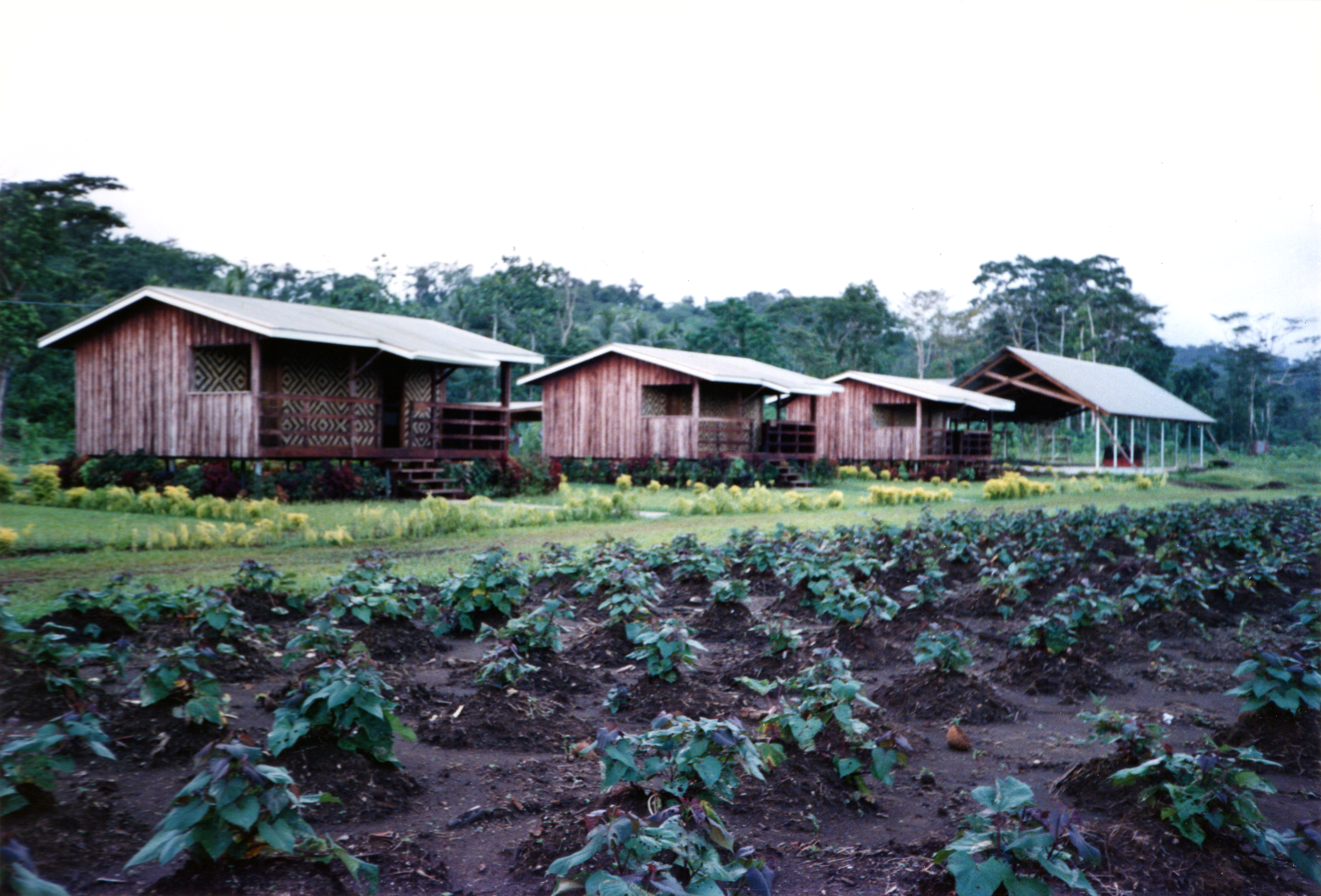
Student dormitories of the Stuyvenberg RTC, with sweet potato plantation on 3 June 1993.

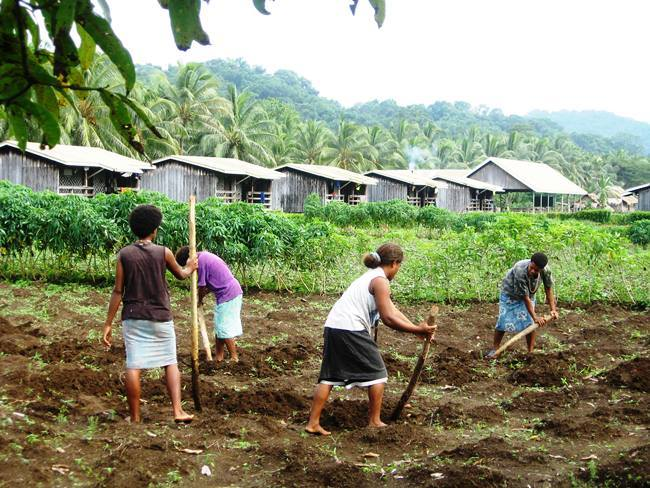
Students gardening at the Stuyvenberg RTC, presumably in 2011.

Two pictures from the Stuyvenberg Rural Training Centre, from 1993 (top) and around 2011 (bottom) respectively, from a very similar standpoint and angle.

The Stuyvenberg Rural Training Centre (abbreviated "Stuyvenberg RTC") is a rural boarding centre of vocational education by the Society of Mary, located on the north coast of eastern Makira in Solomon Islands. It aims to provide skills to standard six school–leavers to be used in the rural area, or to assist standard six and form three school-leavers in their future career planning. Agriculture comprises most of its education. The centre was founded by the Dutch Marist Fr. George Vanderzant in 1991, when there were 25 students.

It is located in Na'ana, situated on fertile coastal land, an extensive food plain of the Weinagho (and others), and is located close to a natural water sources, such as the Weinagho and other rivers.

A 2010 source noted that, due to a lack of electricity was not available at the centre, neither via a generator, nor via water or solar power. Therefore, the centre does not have computers. At that time, electricity and internet access were at a travelling distance of 2.5 hours (which is also the time needed for travel between the centre and Kirakira by canoe). The mentioned source noted that the centre encompassed 92 students. In 2009, it was noted that there were over a hundred.

In 1998, the construction of an airport was started.

== Finances ==
Its relative expenditure on staff training for the period of 1993—June 1997 amounted to 1.8% of the total expenditure. Its relative expenditure on workshops or courses for the same period amounted to 4.5%.

In 2009, it was allocated a budget of 156,254 Solomon Islands dollars, as part of a Community Service Obligations/Community-Based Organisations Partnership.

== Agriculture ==
=== Crops ===
A 2009 reported noted that there were three Malayan Dwarf coconut palms at the centre which suffered from chlorosis, which could perhaps be due to a disease or due to the impoverishing of soil by removed scrapings to make the airstrip. It was advised to notify the Solomon Islands Department of Agriculture and Livestock if the chlorosis were to spread out, or if the yellowing of the Malayan Dwarfs increased. Little leaf disease was suspected in the centre's sweet potato, and advised to report further spread to the Department of Agriculture and Livestock and to Kastom Gaden Association.

The report also noted that the centre had sweet potato and cassava between hedges of Gliricidia sepium on an area without topsoil, praised its soil reclamation as a good example, and stressed the potential of leguminous trees.

=== Bee keeping ===
Students at the centre partake in bee keeping. Marist Fr. David John Galvin, who grew up in Cambridge, Massachusetts, seems to have introduced bee keeping into the Stuyvenberg RTC.

Fr. Galvin had developed an international reputation for bee keeping in general, and for domesticating wild Asian bees in particular. Around 2008, he returned to the centre, after going to Solomon Islands as a missionary some 42 years beforehand (before his first visit, he completed a MA at the request of the bishop in the Solomon Islands). In 2010, he was 73 years of age and in the United States for medical treatment, waiting to return to the South Pacific.

== Courses ==
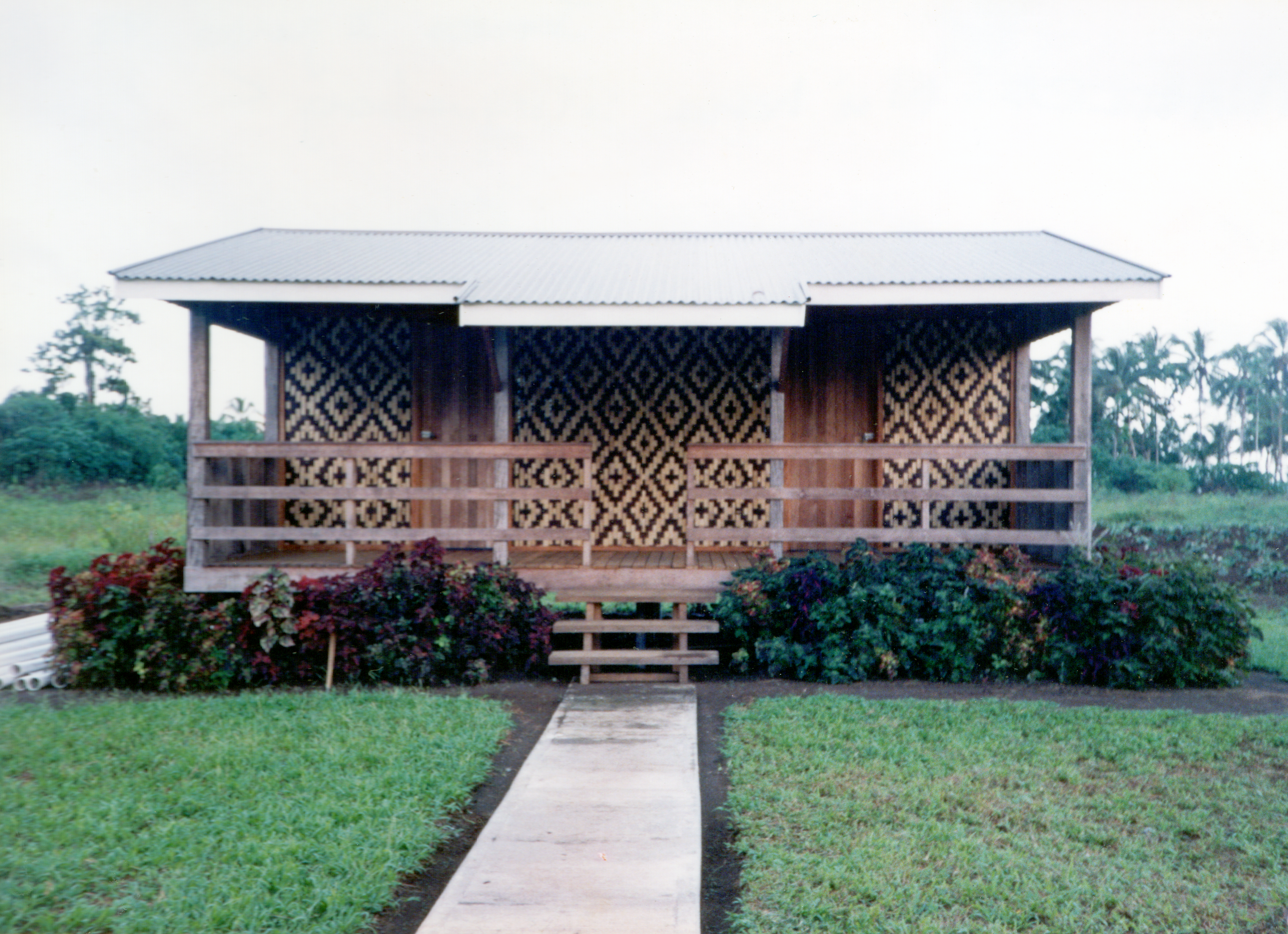
The library of the Stuyvenberg Rural Training Centre on 3 June 1993.

Its courses encompass four years, according to a study of technical and vocational education and training conducted by a consultant team under the auspices of the European Union. Its form of accreditation is a certificate.

Among its offered courses are:

- Agriculture;
- Certificate Building;
- Business Carpentry;
- Carving;
- Chainsaw Maintenance;
- English;
- Maths;
- Home Economics;
- Christian Education; and
- Sports.

Further more, one source reports that its youth are trained in:

- Animal husbandry;
- Small engine maintenance;
- Child care; and
- Leadership/communication skills.
