= Warangal Multi Super Speciality Hospital =

Coordinates: 17.9959°N 79.5919°E

- Government of Telangana

Geography
- Location: Warangal, Telangana, India

Organisation
- Care system: Public
- Type: Full-service medical center, referral, and teaching hospital

Services
- Beds: 2000

Links
- Lists: Hospitals in India

Warangal super speciality hospital
- వరంగల్ సూపర్ స్పెషాలిటీ హాస్పిటల్
- Interactive map of the Warangal super speciality hospital area
- Alternative names: New MGM

General information
- Location: Warangal, Warangal
- Construction started: 2021; 5 years ago
- Completed: 2024
- Cost: 12 billion
- Owner: Government of Telangana

Height
- Top floor: 24-floor

Technical details
- Floor count: 24
- Floor area: 24 floors

Design and construction
- Architects: L&T
- Main contractor: L&T

Warangal Multi Super Speciality Hospital is an under construction 24-floor government-owned super speciality hospital in Warangal, Telangana, India. Foundation stone was laid in June 2021 by Kalvakuntla Chandrashekhar Rao, then Chief Minister of Telangana.
