= Festival of Pacific Arts =

Oceanian cultural festival

Festival of Pacific Islands Arts and Culture
- Genre: Pacific Islands music and dance
- Dates: Quadrennially
- Locations: Oceania; host location varies
- Years active: Since 1972; see table below
- Website: Festival history, Current festival (redirect page)

The Festival of Pacific Arts and Culture (FestPAC), also known as the Pacific Arts Festival, is a travelling festival hosted every four years in Oceania. It was conceived by the Pacific Community as a means to stem erosion of traditional cultural practices by sharing and exchanging culture at each festival. The major theme of the festival is traditional song and dance.

== Organisation ==
The Pacific Cultural Council (formerly "Pacific Arts Council" or "Council of Pacific Arts", originally "South Pacific Arts Festival Council") selects the host country and recognises that each participating country desires the opportunity to showcase its unique indigenous culture by hosting the festival. Host selection is based on principles of equity and preference is given to countries which have not yet hosted. The festival host country pays participants' costs of local travel, accommodation, meals, and other forms of hospitality. Entry to all artistic events is free to the public thereby maximising cultural outreach and inclusion.

The Pacific Ocean limits social and cultural interchange between the inhabitants of its island countries. The festival functions as a cultural exchange rather than a competition, bringing people together to reinforce regional identity and mutual appreciation of Pacific-wide culture. Participating countries select artist-delegates to represent the nation at this gathering of cultures.

Indigenous land-rights activist Eddie Koiki Mabo was heavily involved in the organisation of the 1988 festival held in Townsville, working as Community Arts Officer with the Department of Aboriginal Affairs.

== 2008 FestPAC in American Samoa ==
The 10th Festival of Pacific Arts was hosted by American Samoa from 20 July to 2 August 2008. About 2,000 artists attended the 2008 Festival of Pacific Arts from these participating countries: American Samoa, Australia, Cook Islands, Easter Island, Federated States of Micronesia, Fiji, French Polynesia, Guam, Hawaii, Kiribati, Marshall Islands, Nauru, New Caledonia, New Zealand, Niue, Norfolk Island, Northern Mariana Islands, Palau, Papua New Guinea, Pitcairn Islands, Samoa, Solomon Islands, Tokelau, Tonga, Tuvalu, Vanuatu, and Wallis and Futuna. Taiwan was allowed to send a delegation of 80 performers and artists, most of whom were Taiwanese aborigines, to the Festival of Pacific Arts for the first time in 2008.

== 2012 FestPAC in Solomon Islands ==
Doreen Kuper was the Chair of the Festival of Pacific Arts that was held in Honiara in 2012. The festival attracted an audience of 200,000 people, with 3,000 performers from twenty-four countries taking part. During her time as Chair, Kuper led calls for the repatriation of art and artefacts to the Solomon Islands from non-Pacific countries.

== 2024 FestPAC in Hawaii ==
The 13th Festival of Pacific Arts & Culture convened in Hawaii in June 2024. "Ho‘oulu Lāhui: Regenerating Oceania" served as the theme of FestPAC Hawaiʻi 2024, honouring the traditions that FestPAC exists to perpetuate with an eye toward the future.

In 2018, the Hawaii State Legislature appointed a temporary commission to oversee the planning and implementation of FestPAC Hawaii. Its nine members, appointed by the Governor, state lawmakers and officials, represented the culture, spirit and heart of Hawaiʻi. Many have experienced the power of FestPAC first hand over the years.

== Locations ==
Iteration	Year	Dates	Location	Theme and notes
1st	1972	6–20 May	Suva, Fiji	"Preserving culture"
2nd	1976	6–13 March	Rotorua, New Zealand	"Sharing culture"
3rd	1980	30 June–12 July	Port Moresby, Papua New Guinea	"Pacific awareness"
4th	1985	29 June–15 July	Tahiti, French Polynesia	"My Pacific"
5th	1988	14–24 August	Townsville, Australia	"Cultural interchange" In this year, Aboriginal Australian playwright and screenwriter Bob Merritt was chair.
6th	1992	16–27 October	Rarotonga, Cook Islands	"Seafaring heritage"
7th	1996	8–23 September	Apia, Western Samoa	"Tala Measina"
8th	2000	23 October–3 November	Nouméa, New Caledonia	"Words of past, present, future"
9th	2004	22–31 July	Koror, Palau	"Oltobed a Malt – Nurture, Regenerate, Celebrate"
10th	2008	20 July–2 August	Pago Pago, American Samoa	"Suʻigaʻula a le Atuvasa: Threading the Oceania ʻUla"
11th	2012	1–14 July	Honiara, Solomon Islands	"Culture in Harmony with Nature"
12th	2016	22 May–4 June	Hagåtña, Guam	"What We Own, What We Have, What We Share, United Voices of the PACIFIC" ~ "Håfa Iyo-ta, Håfa Guinahå-ta, Håfa Ta Påtte, Dinanña’ Sunidu Siha Giya PASIFIKU"
—	2020	10–21 June	Honolulu, Hawaii	Cancelled due to the COVID-19 pandemic
13th	2024	6–16 June	Honolulu, Hawaii	"Hoʻoulu Lāhui: Regenerating Oceania"
14th	2028	12-23 June	Nouméa, New Caledonia	TBD

== See also ==
- Austronesian peoples
- Pasifika Festival, annual one-day Polynesian festival in March, attracting up to 200,000 in Auckland, New Zealand
- Bernice P. Bishop Museum, in Honolulu, houses the world's largest collection of Polynesian artifacts. It is also known as the Hawaiʻi State Museum of Natural and Cultural History.
- Pacific Islands for Melanesia, Micronesia, Polynesia groupings synopsis.
- Artists from Hawaii (links to Hawaiian artists category)
- List of Hawaiian cultural topics (links to Hawaiian culture category)
- New Zealand artists (links to New Zealand artists category)
- Hawaiian Renaissance
- History of Indigenous Australians
- History of the Pacific Islands
