= Govindarajula Gutta =

- Community
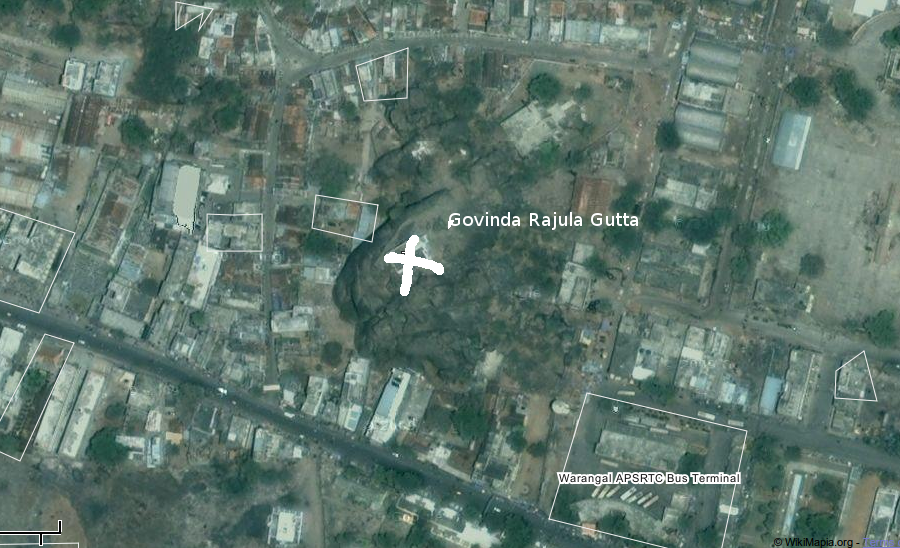
- Govinda Rajula Gutta

- Location in Telangana, India Govindarajula Gutta (India)
- Country: India
- State: Telangana
- District: Warangal

Government
  - Type: Democratic

Languages
  - Official: Telugu
- Time zone: UTC+5:30 (IST)

Govindarajula Gutta, also written Govinda Rajula Gutta, is an area of Warangal, Telangana, India. It is a popular destination for pilgrimages for practitioners of the Hindu religion, with a temple to dedicated to Lord Ram at the top of the hill, as well as a temple to Lord Hanuman below it. The peak period for visits to Govindarajula Gutta is during the Sree Rama Navani festival.

The area is part of the 27th election ward of Greater Warangal Municipal Corporation.
