= Makira =

Island in Solomon Islands

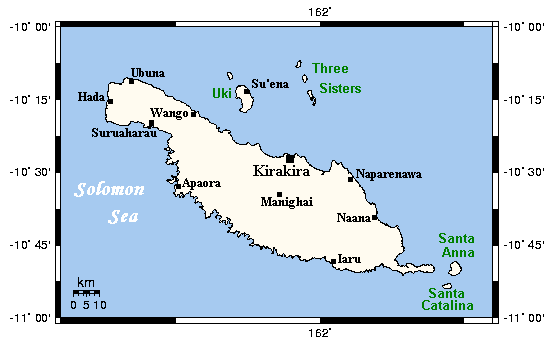
- Makira and nearby islands

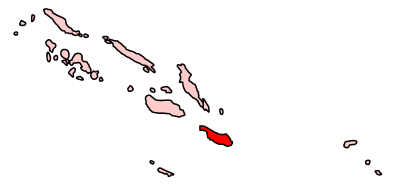
- Location of Makira in Solomon Islands

Geography
- Location: Solomon Islands
- Coordinates: 10°33′04″S 161°49′41″E
- Archipelago: Solomon Islands (archipelago)
- Area: 3,190 km^{2} (1,230 sq mi)
- Highest elevation: 4,101 ft (1250 m)
- Highest point: Unnamed Point

Administration
- Solomon Islands
- Province: Makira-Ulawa Province
- Largest settlement: Kirakira

Demographics
- Population: 51,587 (province) (2019)

The island of Makira (previously known as San Cristóbal) is the largest island of Makira-Ulawa Province in Solomon Islands. It is third most populous of the Solomon Islands after Malaita and Guadalcanal, with Makira-Ulawa Province having a population of 51,587 as of 2019. The island is located east of Guadalcanal and south of Malaita. The largest and capital city is Kirakira.

== History ==
The first recorded sighting by Europeans of Makira was by the Spanish expedition of Álvaro de Mendaña in June 1568. More precisely the sighting and also landing in San Cristóbal was due to a local voyage that set out from Guadalcanal in a small boat, in the accounts the brigantine Santiago, commanded by Alférez Hernando Enriquez and having Hernán Gallego as pilot. They charted it as San Cristóbal.

== Education ==
The Stuyvenberg Rural Training Centre is a rural boarding centre of vocational education by the Society of Mary, located on the north coast of eastern Makira.

== Environment ==
A 182,550 ha tract of largely forested land encompassing the eastern part of the island has been identified by BirdLife International as an Important Bird Area (IBA) because it supports populations of several threatened or endemic bird species. The site extends from the rocky cliffs of the coast to the island's central Bauro Highlands, including the catchments of the Warihito and Raro Rivers, reaching an altitude of 1,200 m, and consisting largely of tropical rainforest. The landscape is rugged, with steep-sided valleys, many streams and waterfalls, and small perched floodplains. Potential threats to the environment are logging, invasive species and human population growth.

=== Birds ===
Significant birds include Melanesian scrubfowl, yellow-legged pigeons, crested cuckoo-doves, red-knobbed and chestnut-bellied imperial pigeons, white-headed fruit doves, Makira boobooks, pied goshawks, Sanford's sea eagles, Makira dwarf kingfishers, Meek's and duchess lorikeets, yellow-bibbed lories, green pygmy-parrots, Makira honeyeaters, sooty myzomelas, long-tailed trillers, dusky fantails, Makira flycatchers, white-collared and Makira monarchs, island leaf-warblers, shade bush warblers, grey-throated white-eyes, Makira starlings, Makira thrushes and mottled flowerpeckers. The Makira woodhen, or moorhen, has not been seen since 1953; the thick-billed ground dove has not been recorded since 1927 and is presumed extinct.

=== Other biota ===
Five species of restricted-range bats have been recorded, as well as a possibly new species of giant rat (Solomys). There are two species of endemic fig (Ficus).

== Notable people ==
- Doreen Kuper - former Honorary Consul to New Zealand
- John Saunana - novelist, poet, and politician

== Gallery ==
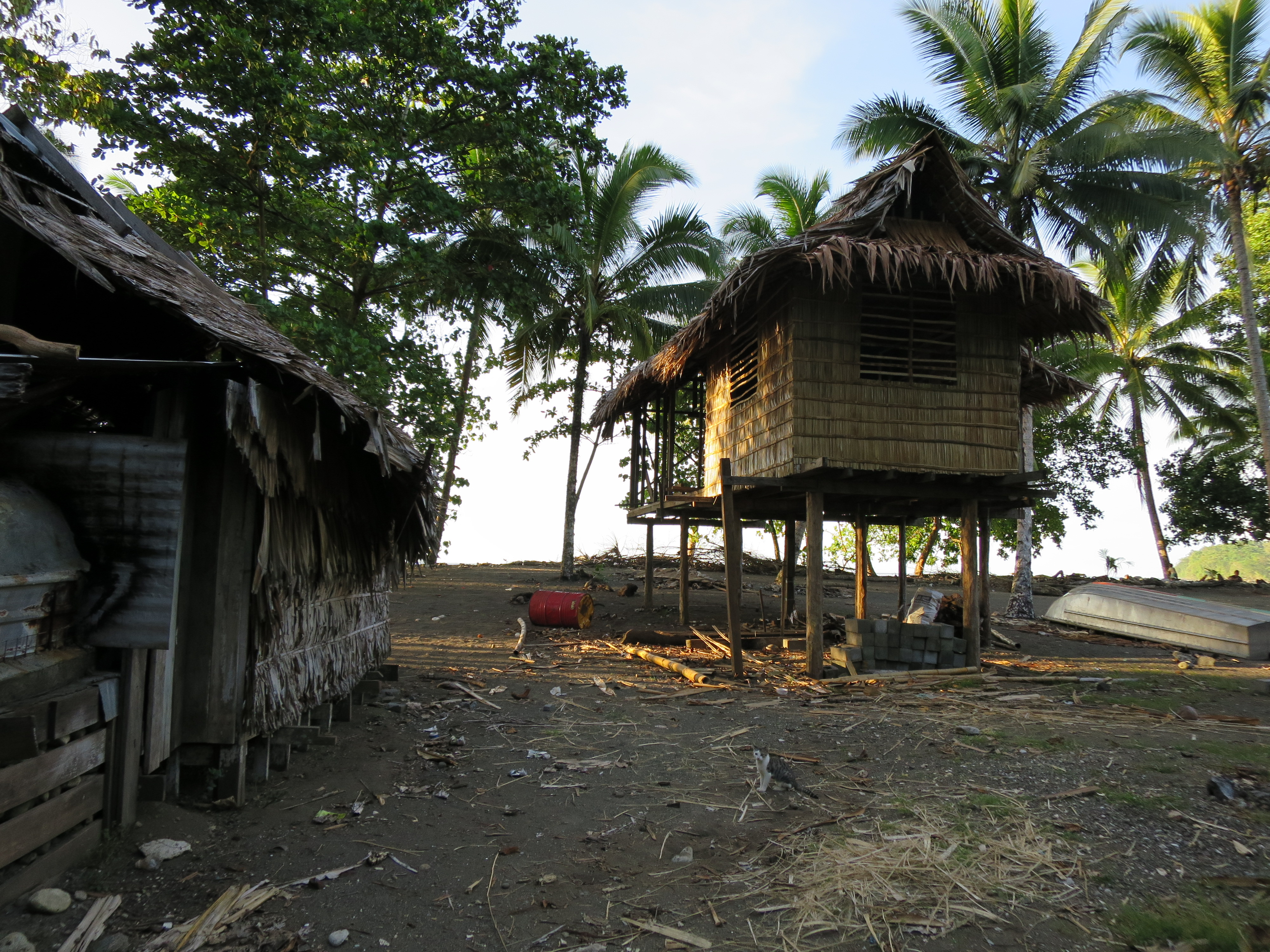
Some of the local houses next to the beach at Kirakira

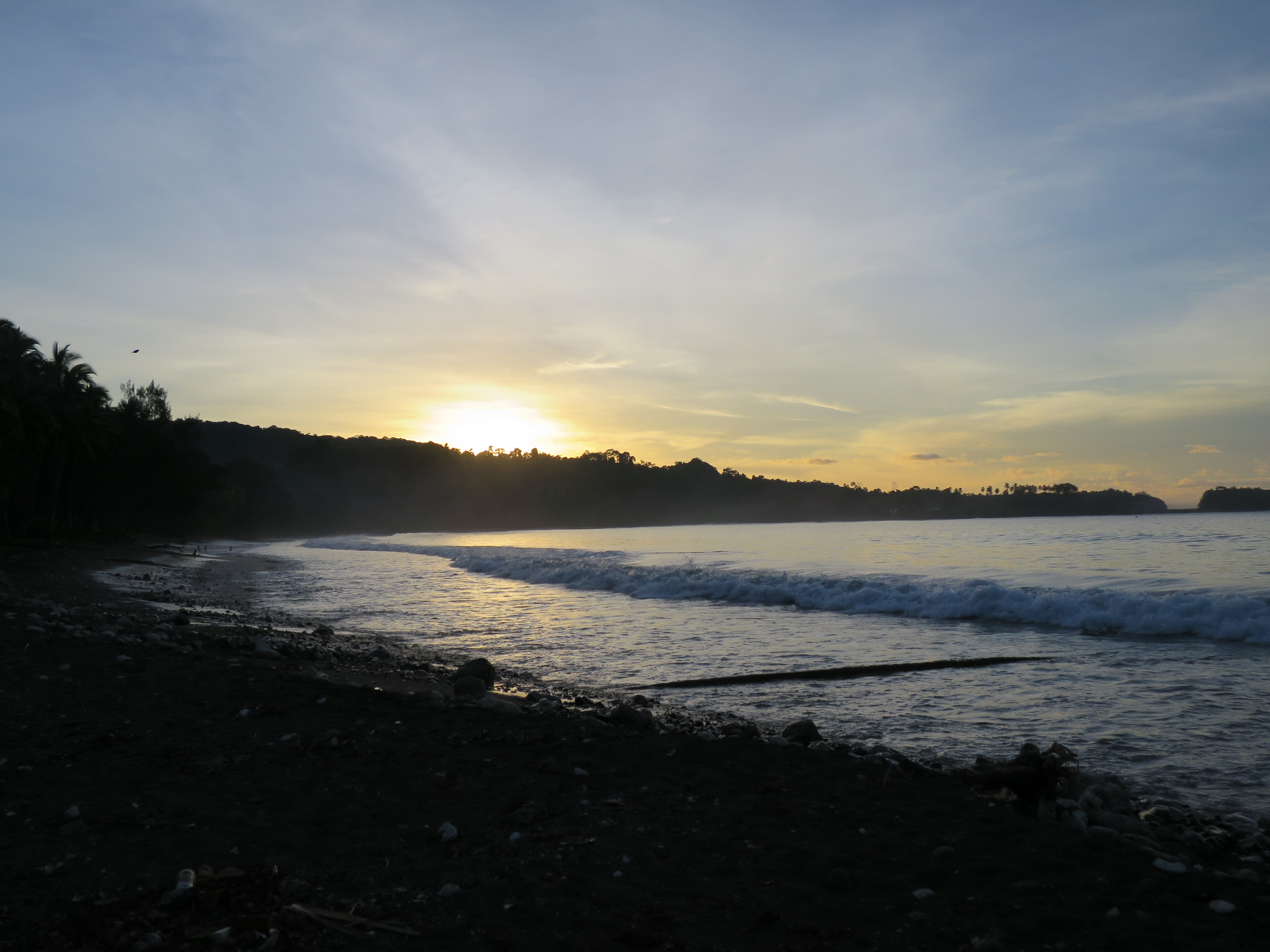
A Kirakira beach at sunset
