= St. Gabriel's High School =

St.Gabriel's High School
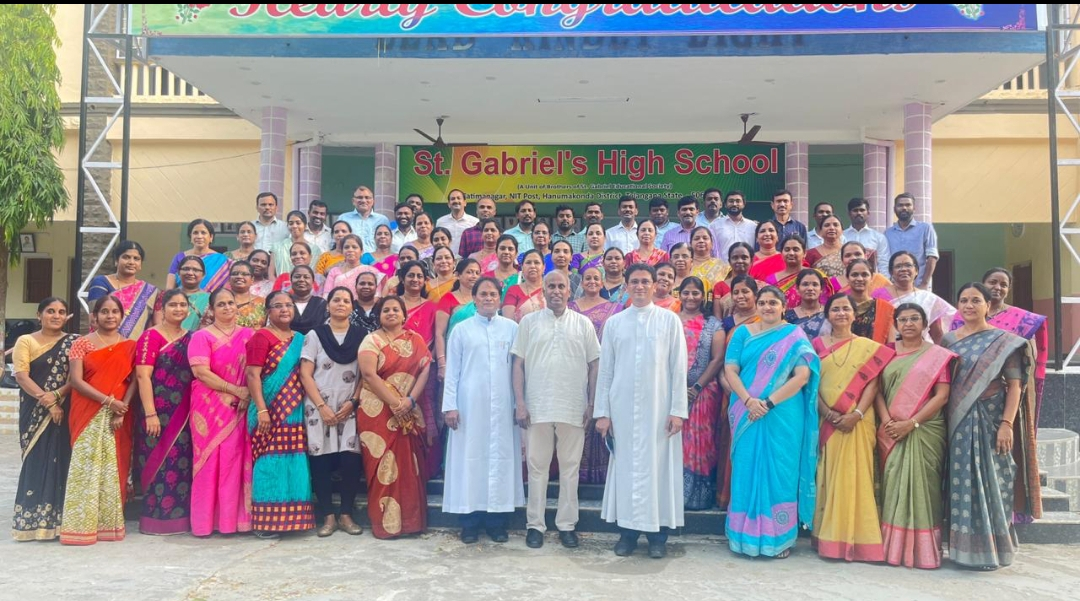
- SGHS_Teachers

Location
- Kazipet, Warangal, Telangana; India; 17°58′54″N 79°31′20″E

Information
- Established: June 1955
- Founder: Bro. Vincent
- Principal: Rev. Bro. Anthony Polishetty
- Enrollment: Lower kindergarten to 10th standard
- Language: English, Telugu and Hindi
- Hours in school day: 8
- Campuses: Primary section and high school section
- Campus size: 20 acres (81,000 m^{2})
- Campus type: Urban
- Houses: sapphire garnet topaz zircon
- Colour: Olive green
- Song: Lead Kindly Light
- Sports: Basketball, cricket, football, table tennis, badminton, throwball, volleyball, athletics
- Affiliation: SSC
- Website: www.stgabrielkazipet.com

St. Gabriel's High School (abbreviated SGHS) is an educational institution located in Kazipet, in Warangal district of Telangana, India. It was established in 1955 by the late Rev. Bro. Vincent. The school is a Montfortian Institution.

== History ==
St. Gabriel's High School, Kazipet (Co-Education) is a minority institution. It was established by 'The Brothers of St. Gabriel Educational Society' in June 1955. It is recognised by the Government of Telangana and runs classes from L.K.G. to X. It prepares students for S.S.C. Examination through English Medium.

The Society of the Montfort Brothers of St. Gabriel was founded by St. Louis Marie Grignion de Montfort (1673-1716), a Frenchman, for the education of children and youth, especially of poorer families.

== Anthem and flag ==
The school anthem is Lead, Kindly Light. The school flag has two colours, olive green and white, and the school emblem. These are also the colours of the school uniform and tie.

== Academics ==
St. Gabriel's High School's curriculum is as prescribed by the Secondary School Certificate (SSC) board. The medium of instruction is English. It provides computer education to students from nursery-10thgrades. The school's best performance was securing All India Open Category 1st rank in the IIT-JEE 2010 examination.

== Sports ==
The school has an enormous playground adjacent to the main block. It includes three Football courts, two Volleyball courts, a Netball court, and two Basketball courts. Two football courts put together made a Cricket ground. Students have one to two drill periods per week.

Competitions like the school level, inter school competitions, selections for the Montfort sports meet and various national programmes are held in the school.

== Principals ==
- Bro. Vincent (1955–1958)
- Bro. John of god (1958–1962)
- Bro. Eugenius (1962–1965)
- Bro. Amancius (1965–1967)
- Bro. Eugene Mary (1967–1971)
- Bro. James Uralil (1971–1974)
- Bro. Berchmanas (1974–1977)
- Bro. Vincent (1977–1980)
- Bro. Lambert Mary (1980–1983)
- Bro. Alexander (1983–1986)
- Bro. Claude (1986–1989)
- Bro. John Kallarackal (1989–1990)
- Bro. M.P. Thomas (1990–1994)
- Bro. K.T. Chacko (1994–1997)
- Bro. John Kallarackal (1997–2000)
- Bro. K.M. Joseph (2000–2004)
- Bro. Bala Bhaskar. M (2004–2007)
- Bro. P.T. Sebastian (2007–2013)
- Bro. Roque D'Cuhna (2013–2015)
- Bro. Maynard Heldt (2015–2017)
- Bro. Jaico Gervasis (2017–2019)
- Bro. Arun Prakash (2019–2023)
- Bro. P. Anthony (2023–2025)
- Bro. Joseph Amala Rajan (2025- )
