= Gutta (name) =

Gutta is an Indian surname. Notable people with the surname include:

- Jwala Gutta (born 1983), Indian badminton player
- Vijaya Bapineedu (Gutta Bapineedu Chowdary, 1936–2019), Indian magazine editor, screenwriter, and film director
