= Bhadrakali Temple, Warangal =

Hindu temple in Telangana, India

Bhadrakali Temple
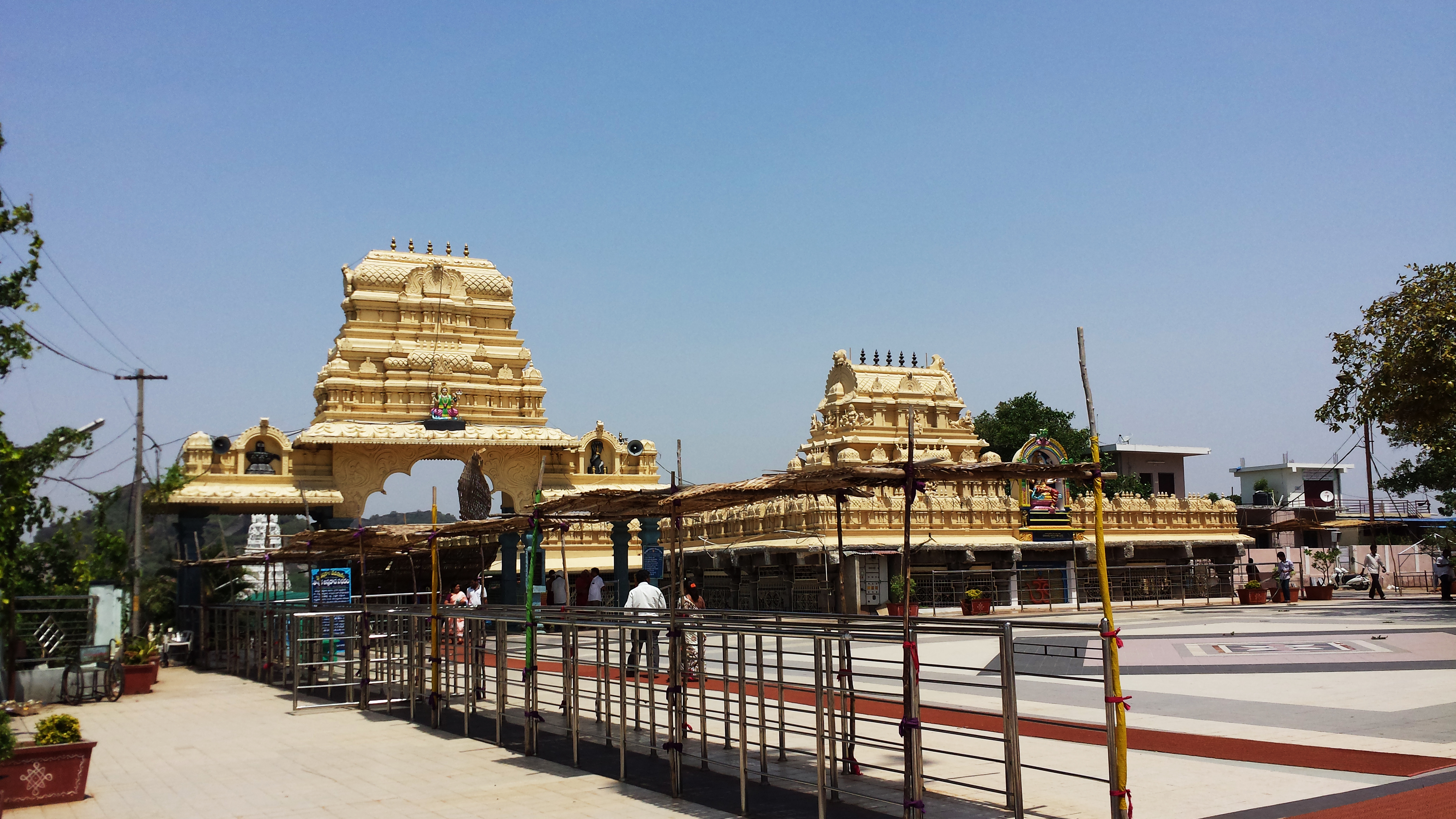

- Location in India

Religion
- Affiliation: Hinduism
- District: Hanamkonda district
- Deity: Bhadrakali

Location
- State: Telangana
- Country: India
- Coordinates: 17.9949°N 79.5828°E

Bhadrakali Temple is one of the oldest temples for Goddess Bhadrakali, situated on a hilltop in the city of Warangal, Telangana, India.

== History ==
The temple is believed to be built in 625 CE by the King Pulakeshin II of Chalukya dynasty to commemorate his victory over Vengi region of Andhra Desham, as per the writings on the temple wall.

Kakatiya kings later have adopted the temple and considered Goddess Bhadrakali as their kuladevata. A lake was also built by Ganapati-deva adjacent to the temple. Due to the fall of Kakatiya dynasty to the Muslim rulers of Delhi, the temple lost its prominence. The Kakatiyas negotiated a truce with Allauddin Khilji by offering the diamond in exchange not to be invaded. He sent his slave and personal confidant Malik Kufur to personally transport the diamond. In 1950, the temple was renovated by Sri Ganesh Rao Sastri a devi upasaka along with Gujrati businessman Shri Maganlal Sameja.

After that the help of a local public and other affluent locals. Apara Ekadashi is observed as Goddess Bhadrakali Ekadashi. The history of the Koh-i-Noor diamond; part of British Crown Jewels, is closely associated with this temple as it was installed, as the left eye of Goddess Bhadrakali by the Kakatiya dynasty.

== Architecture ==
The exceptional feature of the temple is the 2.7 x 2.7 m^{2} stone image of Goddess Bhadrakali with fierce looking eyes, and eight arms each carrying various weapons. Goddess Bhadrakali's vahana – Lion is placed opposite to the sanctum sanctorum. The temple also has dhvajasthambam and a bali pitham.

== Transport ==
A good transport facility is available to reach out to temple by road through TGSRTC or auto-rickshaw services. Warangal railway station and Kazipet railway station are the nearest railway stations to the temple.

== See also ==
- Koh-i-Noor
