= Kakatiya Urban Development Authority =

Agency overview
- Formed: 1982
- Preceding agency: Part of Greater Warangal Municipal Corporation
- Type: Urban planning
- Headquarters: Warangal, Telangana, India
- Parent agency: Government of Telangana
- Website: http://www.kuda.in/

The Kakatiya Urban Development Authority (KUDA) is the urban planning agency of Warangal, Telangana, India. It guides orderly and proper future development of the heritage structures, town and its peripheral area.

== History ==
KUDA was established in the year 1982.

== The Authority ==
The first master plan was prepared in 1971 by the municipal authorities for 60 km^{2} by municipal board. The proposed plan would entail 1,800 km^{2}, that includes 171 villages around the city of Warangal.

S.No	District	Mandals	Total mandals
1	Hanamkonda district	Hanamkonda, Khazipet, Hasanparthy, inavole, Dharmasagar, Velair, Bheemadeevarpalli, Elkathurthy, Kamalapur	9
2	Warangal district	Warangal, Khila Warangal, Geesugonda, Sangem, Damera, Atmakur, Wardhanapet	7
3	Jangaon district	Chilpur, Ghanpur(St), Zaffergadh	3
