= Warangal =

Major city in Telangana, India

Warangal Orugallu, Ekashila Nagaram
- City
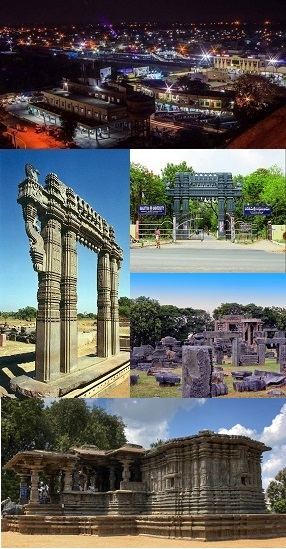
- Clockwise from top: City view as seen from Govindarajula hill, Kakatiya University, Warangal Fort, Thousand Pillar Temple, Kakatiya Kala Thoranam
- Nickname: Tri-City
- Interactive map of Warangal
- Warangal (Telangana) Warangal (India)
- Coordinates: 17.968900°N 79.594100°E
- Country: India
- State: Telangana
- Districts: Warangal, Hanumakonda
- Founded: 1163; 863 years ago
- Founder: Kakatiya dynasty

Government
  - Type: Municipal Corporation
  - Body: Greater Warangal Municipal Corporation; KUDA
  - Mayor: Gundu Sudha Rani (INC)

Area
  - City: 406.97 km^{2} (157.13 sq mi)
  - Metro: 1,805 km^{2} (697 sq mi)
- Elevation: 288 m (945 ft)

Population (2018)
  - City: 557,802
  - Rank: 2nd (Telangana)
  - Density: 2,000/km^{2} (5,200/sq mi)
  - Urban: 1,005,938
  - Metro: 1,080,490
- Demonym(s): Warangalite, Kakatiyan

Languages
  - Official: Telugu
- Time zone: UTC+5:30 (IST)
- PIN: 506001–506019
- Telephone code: +91–0870
- Vehicle registration: TG-24; AP-36 (Former)
- Website: www.gwmc.gov.in

Warangal (Telugu: [ʋɐrɐŋɡɐl]), also known as Orugallu, is a city in the Indian state of Telangana and the district headquarters of Warangal district. It is the second largest city in Telangana with a population of 811,844 per 2011 Census of India, and spreading over an 406 km^{2} (157 sq mi). Warangal served as the capital of the Kakatiya dynasty which was established in 1163. The monuments left by the Kakatiyas include fortresses, lakes, temples and stone gateways which, in the present, helped the city to become a popular tourist attraction. The Kakatiya Kala Thoranam was included in the emblem of Telangana by the state government and Warangal is also touted as the cultural capital of Telangana.

It is one of eleven cities in the country to have been chosen for the Heritage City Development and Augmentation Yojana scheme by the Government of India. It was also selected as a smart city in the "fast-track competition", which makes it eligible for additional investment to improve urban infrastructure and industrial opportunities under the Smart Cities Mission.

UNESCO has included Warangal in its Global Network of Learning Cities (GNLC) in recognition of the city's outstanding efforts to make lifelong learning a reality for all at the local level.

The three urban cities: Kazipet, Hanamkonda and Warangal are together known as Warangal Tri-City. The three cities are connected by the National Highway 163 (Hyderabad–Bhuvanagiri–Warangal–Bhopalpatnam). The major stations are Kazipet Junction railway station and Warangal railway station.

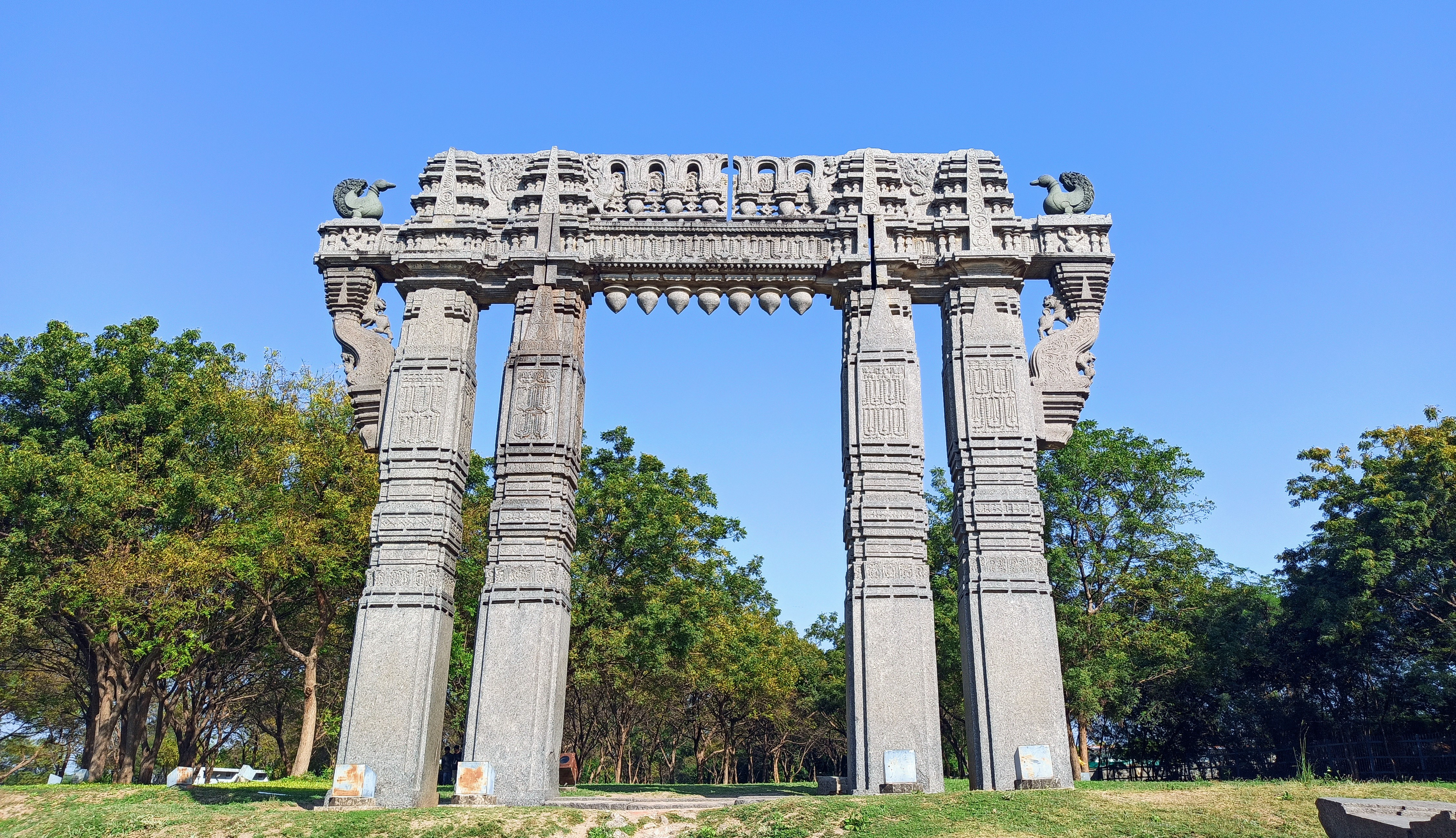
Warangal Fort

== Etymology ==
During the 160 years of Kakatiya rule between 1163 and 1323 CE, Warangal was referred to by various names like Orugallu, Ekashila Nagaram, or Omatikonda; all these mean a 'single stone', referring to a huge granite boulder present in the Warangal fort. When the Kakatiya dynasty was defeated by Delhi Sultanate in 1323 CE, ruler Juna Khan, Crown Prince of Ghiyath al-Din Tughluq, conquered the city and renamed it as Sultanpur. Later Musunuri Nayaks recaptured Warangal in 1336 CE and named it Orugallu again.

== History ==
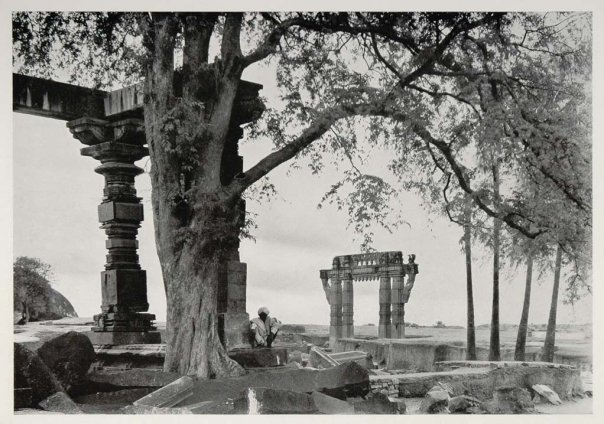
Warangal years ago

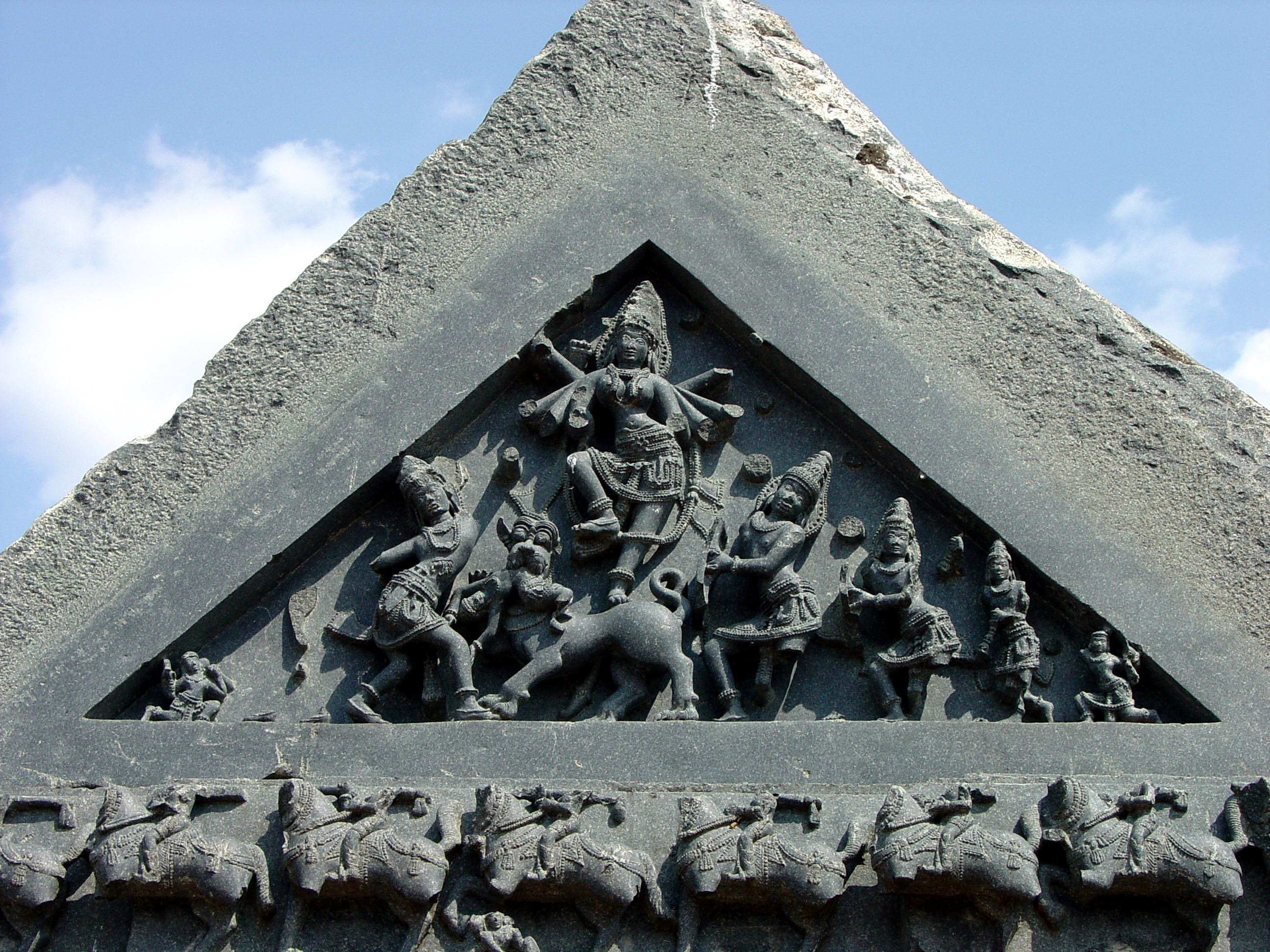
Sculptures at Warangal Fort

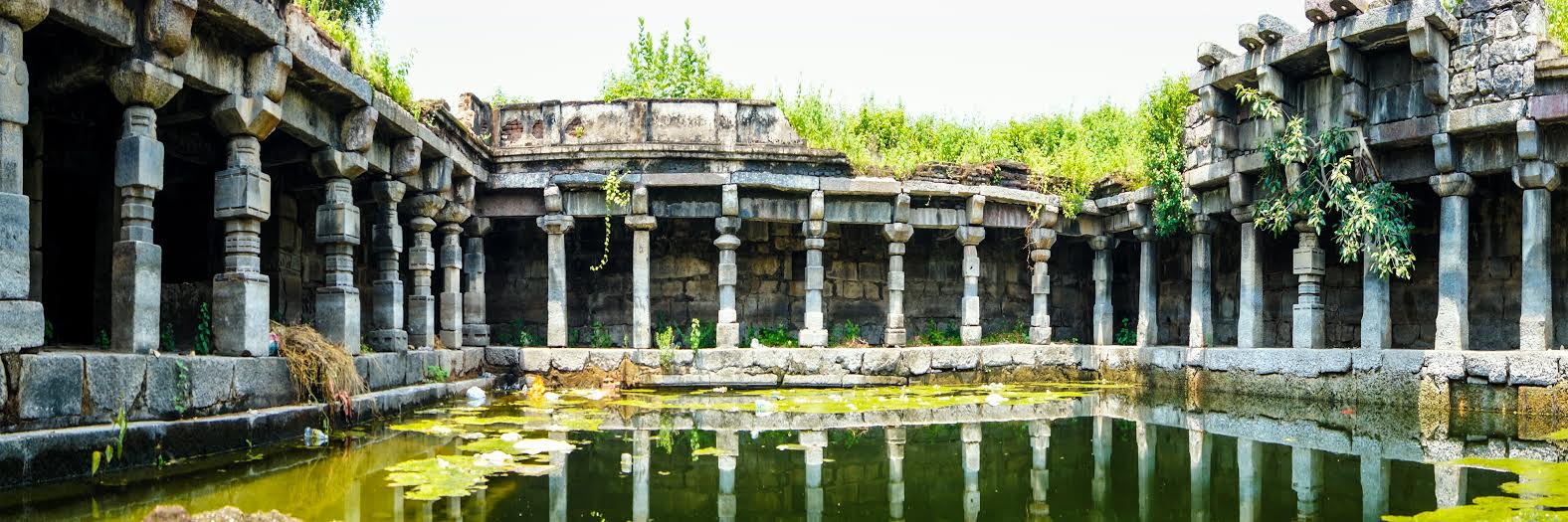
Kakatiyas well at Warangal

Warangal was the ancient capital of the Kakatiya dynasty. It was ruled by many kings such as Beta Raja I, Prola Raja I, Beta Raja II, Prola Raja II, Rudradeva, Mahadeva, Ganapathideva, Prataparudra and Rani Rudrama Devi who is the only woman to rule over Telugu region. Beta Raja I is the founder of Kakatiya Dynasty and ruled the kingdom for 30 years and was succeeded by his son Prola Raja I who shifted his capital to Hanamkonda.

During the rule of Ganapathideva, the capital was shifted from Hanamkonda to Warangal. Kakatiya Period Inscriptions praised Warangal as the best city within the Telugu region, up to shores of the ocean. The Kakatiyas left many monuments, including a fortress, four massive stone gateways, the Swayambhu temple dedicated to Shiva, and the Ramappa temple situated near Ramappa Lake. The cultural and administrative distinction of the Kakatiyas was mentioned by Marco Polo. After the defeat of Prataparudra II, the Musunuri Nayaks united 72 Nayak chieftains and captured Warangal from Delhi Sultanate and ruled for fifty years. After the demise of the Nayaks, Warangal was part of the Bahmani Sultanate and then the Sultanate of Golconda.

The Mughal emperor Aurangzeb conquered Golconda in 1687, and it remained part of the Mughal empire until the southern provinces of the empire split away to become the state of Hyderabad in 1724, which included the Telangana region and some parts of Maharashtra and Karnataka. Hyderabad was annexed to India in 1948, and became an Indian state called Hyderabad state. In 1956, Hyderabad state was partitioned as part of the States Reorganisation Act, and Telangana, the Telugu-speaking region of Hyderabad state, which includes Warangal, became part of Andhra Pradesh. After the Telangana movement, Telangana state was formed on 2 June 2014, Warangal became a part of Telangana State.

== Geography and climate ==
Warangal

Climate chart (precipitation, max. and min. temperature)
J	F	M	A	M	J	J	A	S	O	N	D
- █ Average max. and min. temperatures in °C
- █ Precipitation totals in mm
- Source: mustseeindia.com
Imperial conversion
J	F	M	A	M	J	J	A	S	O	N	D
- █ Average max. and min. temperatures in °F
- █ Precipitation totals in inches

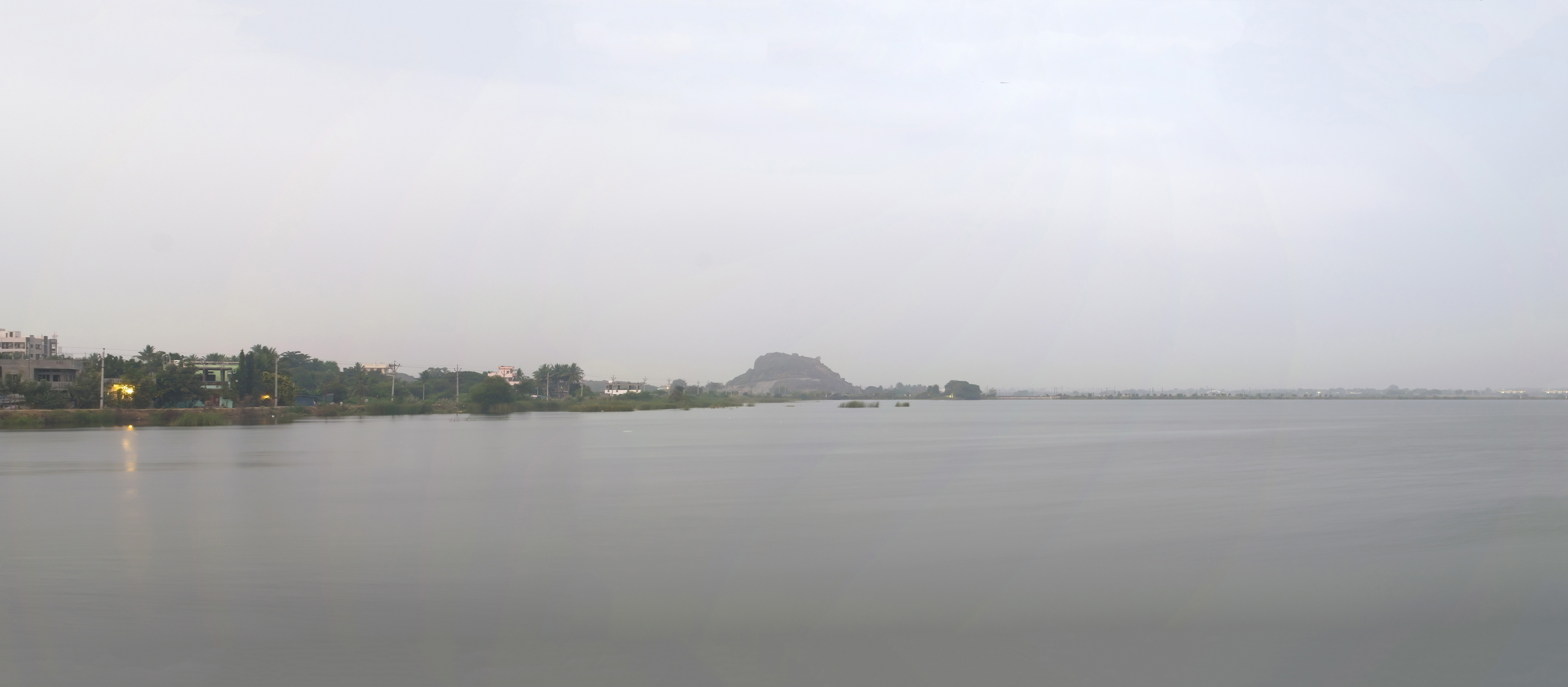
Waddepally Lake

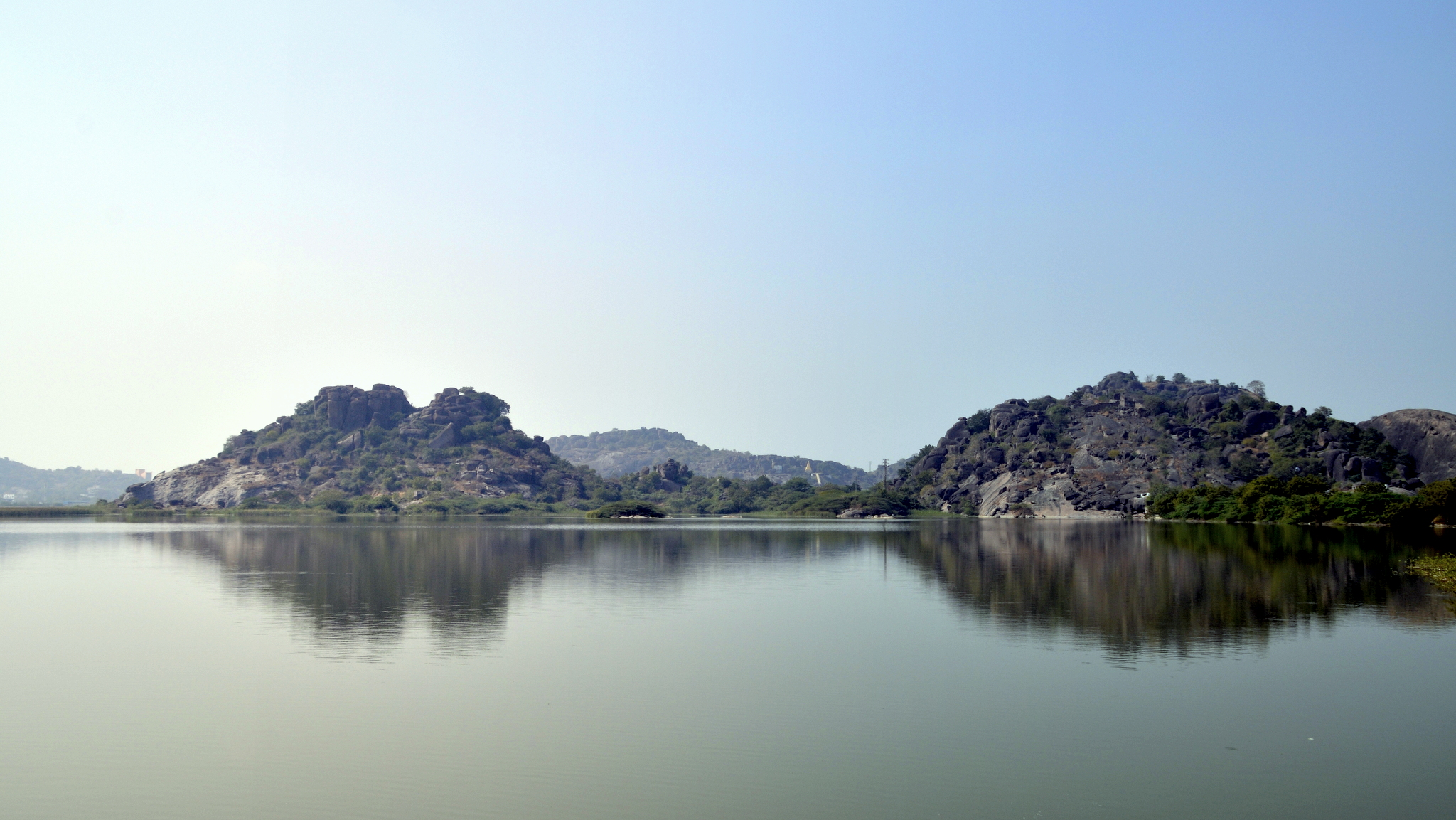
Bhadrakali Lake

Warangal is located at 18.0°N 79.58°E. It has an average elevation of 266 metres (873 feet). It is settled in the eastern part of Deccan Plateau made up of granite rocks and hill formations which left the region barren making the cultivation dependent on seasonal rainfall. There are no major rivers flowing near the city, making it reliant on the Kakatiya Canal, which originates from Sriram Sagar Project, to meet the city's water requirements. Located in the semi-arid region of Telangana, Warangal has a predominantly hot and dry climate. Summer starts in March, and peaks in May with average high temperatures in the 42 °C (108 °F) range. The monsoon arrives in June and lasts until September with about 550 mm (22 in) of precipitation. A dry, mild winter starts in October and lasts until early February, when there is little humidity and average temperatures in the 22–23 °C (72–73 °F) range. Many hill rocks and lakes are located around warangal. Padmakshi hill, mettu gutta, hanumathgiri gutta, ursu gutta and Govinda Rajula Gutta are famous hills with temples.

Bhadrakali Lake, Dharmasagar lake and Waddepally Lake are the three lakes which add scenic beauty and are the major sources of drinking water.

== Demographics ==
Religions in Warangal city (2011)
Religion	Percent
Hinduism	83.41%
Islam	14.39%
Christianity	1.65%
Other or not stated	0.55%
†Includes Sikhs, Jains

Historical population
Year	Pop.	±%
1901	31,186	—
1911	48,342	+55.0%
1921	46,791	−3.2%
1931	62,119	+32.8%
1941	92,808	+49.4%
1951	133,130	+43.4%
1961	160,000	+20.2%
1971	210,040	+31.3%
1981	338,910	+61.4%
1991	447,657	+32.1%
2001	530,636	+18.5%
2011	830,281	+56.5%

As of 2011 Census of India, the city has population of 627,449, which later increased to the present population of 830,281, including the expanded city limits.

The major religion in Warangal is Hinduism, with 83% of the population adhering to it. Islam is the largest minority, at 14%. There are small communities of Christians, Jews, and Buddhists.

== Government and politics ==
=== Civic administration ===
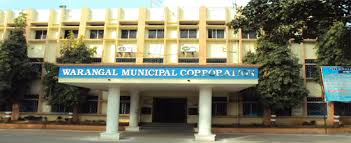
Greater Warangal Municipal Corporation

Greater Warangal Municipal Corporation is the civic body of the city, which oversees the civic needs. Established in 1899, it is one of the oldest urban local bodies in India. City planning is governed by the Kakatiya Urban Development Authority (KUDA), constituted in 1982 by the local government for the planning, development and management of the Kakatiya Urban Development Area. It has its jurisdictional area spread over 1,805 km^{2} (697 mi^{2}), covering 19 mandals, 181 villages in the three districts of Warangal district, Hanamkonda and Jangaon. As of 2016, the corporation has bagged a total of eleven awards in various categories, such as conservation, sanitation, heritage, etc. For electoral purpose, the city is divided into 58 electoral wards, of which 50% are reserved for women. A total of thirty seats are reserved for BC's (19), SC's (9) and ST's (2) respectively.

In October 2012, the corporation conducted Clean Cities Championship, which invited professionals from 57 municipalities across the state for effective waste management and was won by Khammam Municipal Corporation. Following the event, Warangal became the first city in India to achieve 100% door-to-door MSW collection. About 70% of households started practising two-bin MSW segregation into wet and dry waste. 420 cement bins and 128 dumpsters were removed from locations across Warangal making it a no dump city. GWMC was able to reduce the MSW going to landfill by 30% to 40%. and the dumpyard with significantly reduced load is, in phases, being converted into a nature park with vermicomposting sheds.

=== Municipal finance ===
According to financial data published on the CityFinance Portal of the Ministry of Housing and Urban Affairs, the Warangal Municipal Corporation reported total revenue receipts of ₹144 crore (US$17 million) and total expenditure of ₹216 crore (US$26 million) in 2022–23. Tax revenue accounted for about 37.5% of the total revenue, while the corporation received ₹0.46 crore in grants during the financial year.

=== Law and order ===
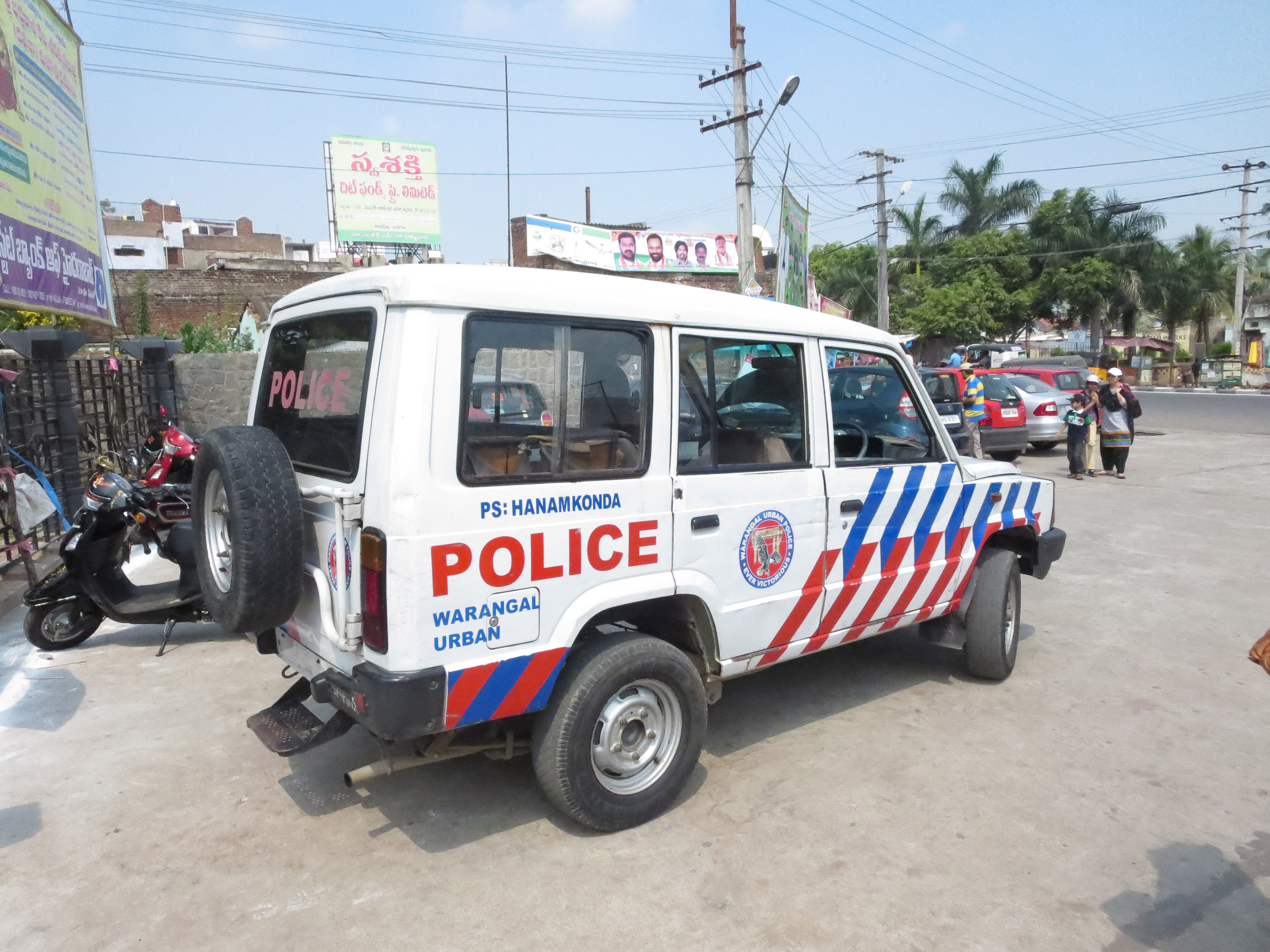
Police patrol vehicle in Warangal

The urban police district, which is responsible for maintaining law and order in city and agglomerated areas around Warangal was converted into a Police Commissionerate by the state government in 2015. Inspector General will be working as police commissioner who is also given magisterial powers. There are around 71 police stations present under Warangal Police Commissionerate.

=== Healthcare ===
There are hospitals in the city for health care. The Mahatma Gandhi Memorial Hospital is the largest hospital in the city, serving the patients from the Adilabad, Khammam and Karimnagar.

== Economy ==
As of 2011 census of India, Warangal is one of the Indian cities that has seen rapid growth of urbanisation from 19%–28%, alongside cities such as Gandhinagar, Kozhikode.

Agriculture is the main economic activity with irrigation depending mainly on monsoon and seasonal rainfalls. Major crops are paddy, cotton, mango and wheat. Warangal benefits from the Godavari lift irrigation scheme which is designed to lift water from the Godavari river to irrigate drought prone areas in the Telangana region. The city hosts second-biggest grain market of Asia, located in Enumamula.

Information Technology is another sector in which the city is making steady progress with its Incubation centre at Madikonda. Recently Tech Mahindra & Cyient have opened their development centres and many other IT majors like Mindtree, quadrant resource will be opening their offices shortly.

In 2023, Kone, a leading elevator manufacturer, opened an office in Warangal.

Healthcare is another important industry in Warangal. The Warangal Multi Super Speciality Hospital is expected to be completed in 2024.

== Transport ==
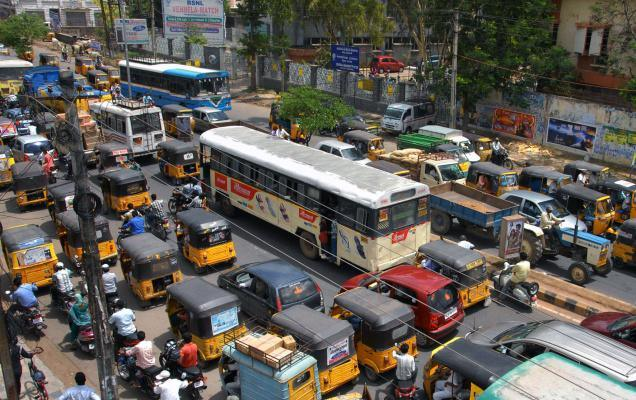
Traffic on Warangal roads

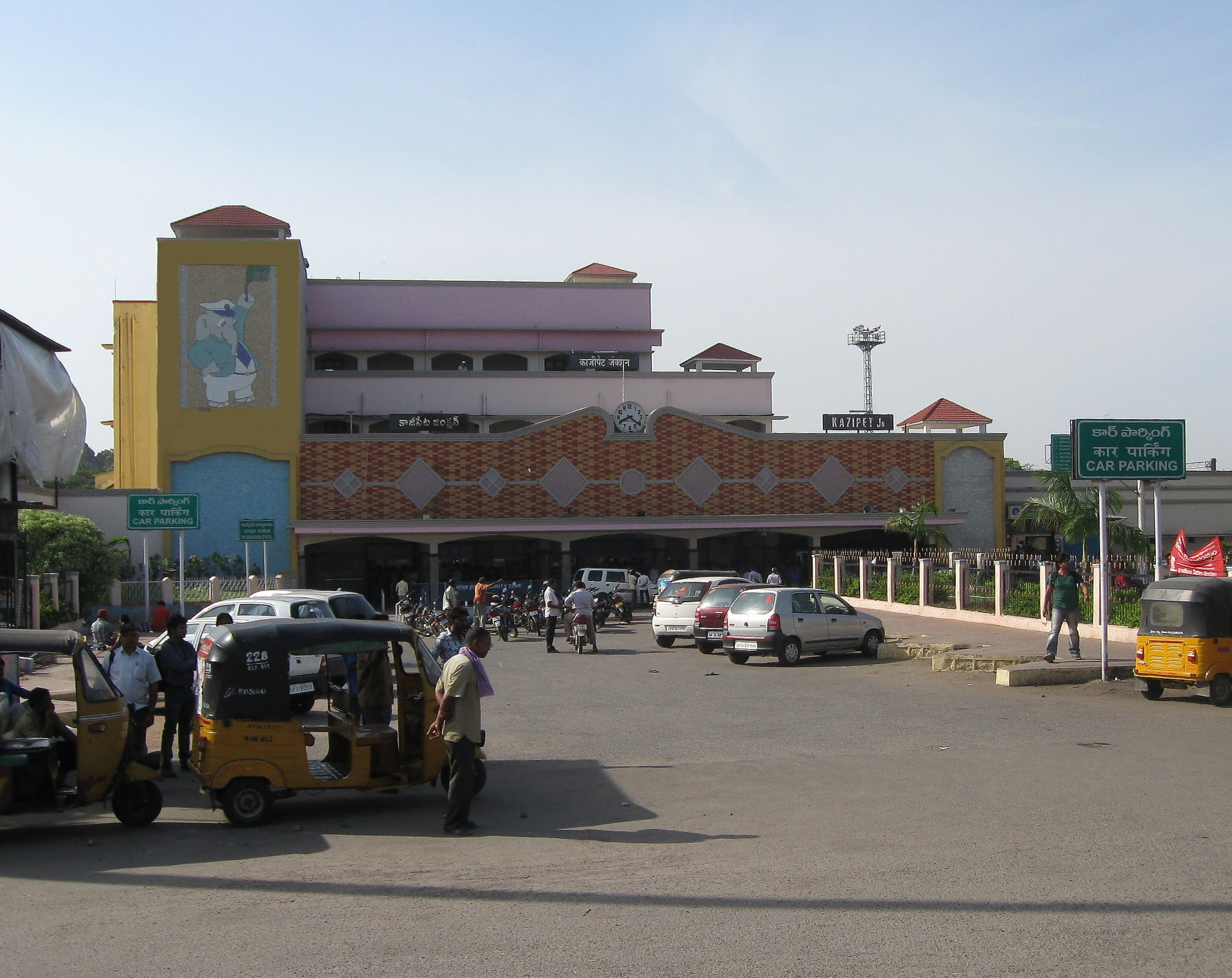
Kazipet railway station

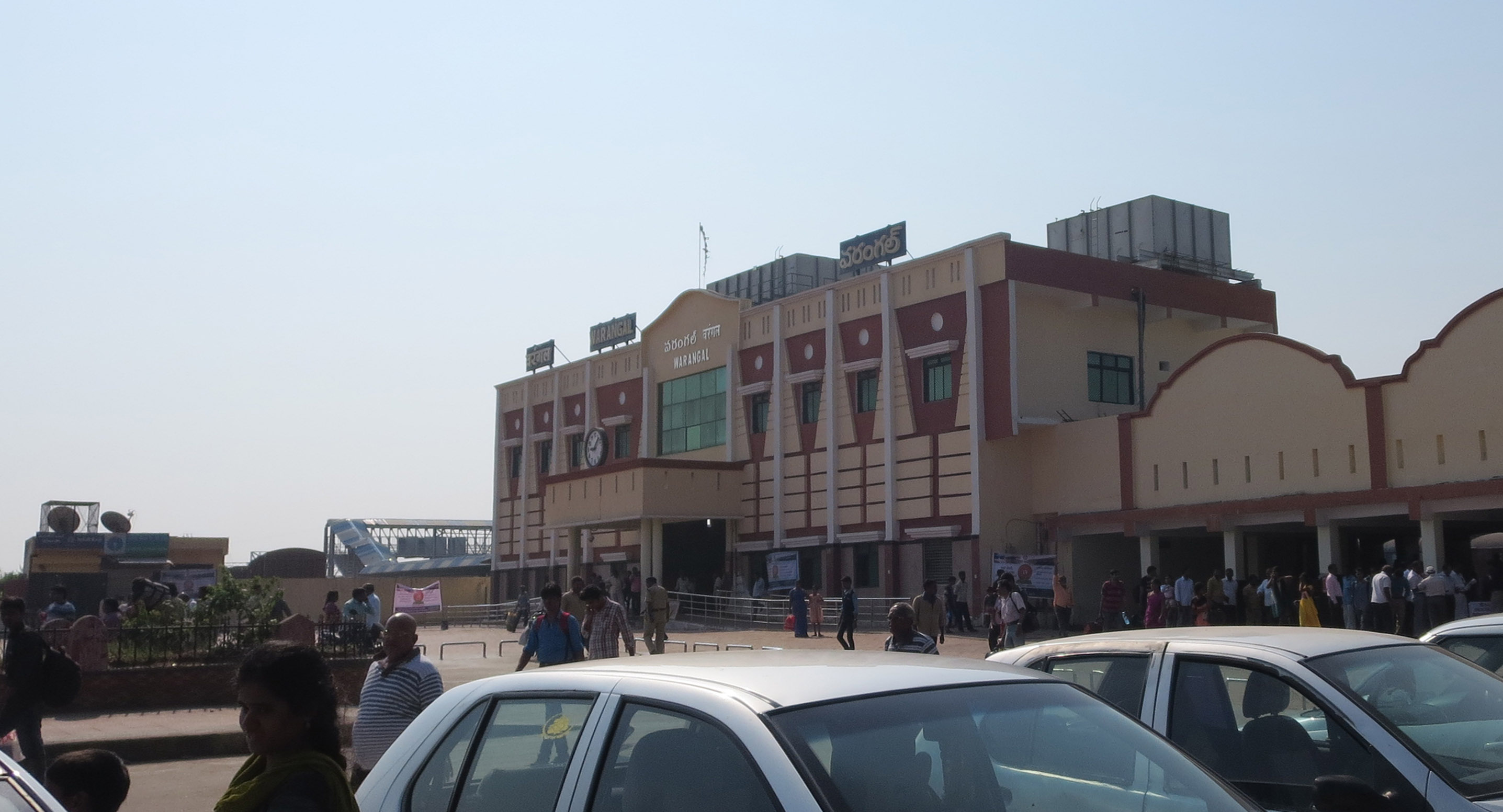
Warangal railway station

=== Roadway ===
The city is connected to major cities and towns by means of road and railways. National and state highways that pass through the city are National Highway 163, connecting Hyderabad and Bhopalpatnam; NH 563 connecting Ramagundam and Khammam; State highway 3. TSRTC operates buses to various destinations from Hanamkonda and Warangal bus stations of the city. Nearly 78 City buses run in various routes across the city and sub urban areas while 45 city buses run from city to nearby villages.

In 2024, it was reported that the construction on NH 563 to make it a four lane highway were nearly complete.

=== Railway ===
Warangal has two railway stations namely, Kazipet and Warangal on the important New Delhi-Chennai main line of Indian Railways. They are administered under the jurisdiction of the Secunderabad railway division of South Central Railway zone. Kazipet Junction shelters both Electric and Diesel Loco sheds with a capacity of holding 175 and 142 locomotives. Kazipet town, Vanchanagiri, Pendial, Hasanparthy Road railway station are the other railway stations within the city limits. The construction of third railway line between Balharshah and Kazipet was sanctioned at an estimated cost of ₹24.032 billion (US$250 million).

In October 2023, the Hadapsar-Hyderabad Express was extended to Kazipet.

A RapidX rail line has been proposed from Warangal to Hyderabad.

=== Airway ===
Warangal has an airport built by the Nizams at Mamnoor in 1930. It was largest airport in undivided India with 1,875 acres of land, a 6.6-km runway, a pilot and staff quarters, a pilot training centre and more than one terminal. Many cargo services and Vayudoot services were served. During the Indo-China war, it served as a hangar for government aircraft due to Delhi airport being a target in combat. It remained in service until 1981.

This airport is currently being used as NCC Training Centre by No. 4(A) air squadron for gliding sorties, skeet shooting and aero-modeling. There is no scheduled commercial air service from this airport at present.

On 31 July 2023, the State Cabinet of Telangana approved the proposal to develop Mamnoor Airport. The proposal calls for the acquisition and subsequent allocation of the last 253 acres of required land to the Airport Authority of India for purposes of constructing a terminal building as well as extending the existing runway to accommodate larger aircraft such as the Boeing 747.

The funds to acquire the remaining land were approved and released in November 2024, in the amount of ₹205 crores.

== Educational institutes ==
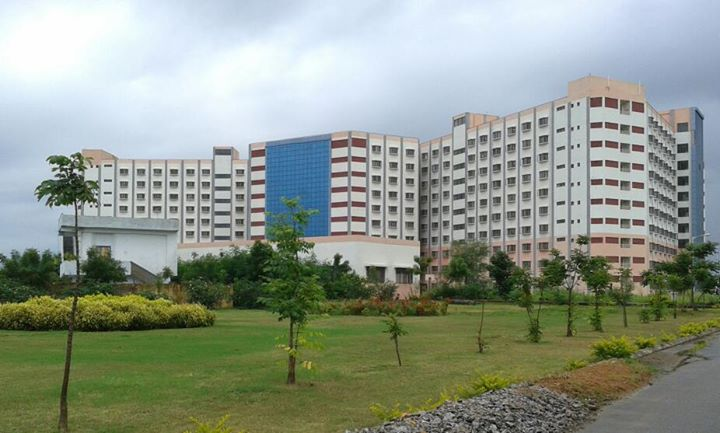
NIT Warangal, established in 1959

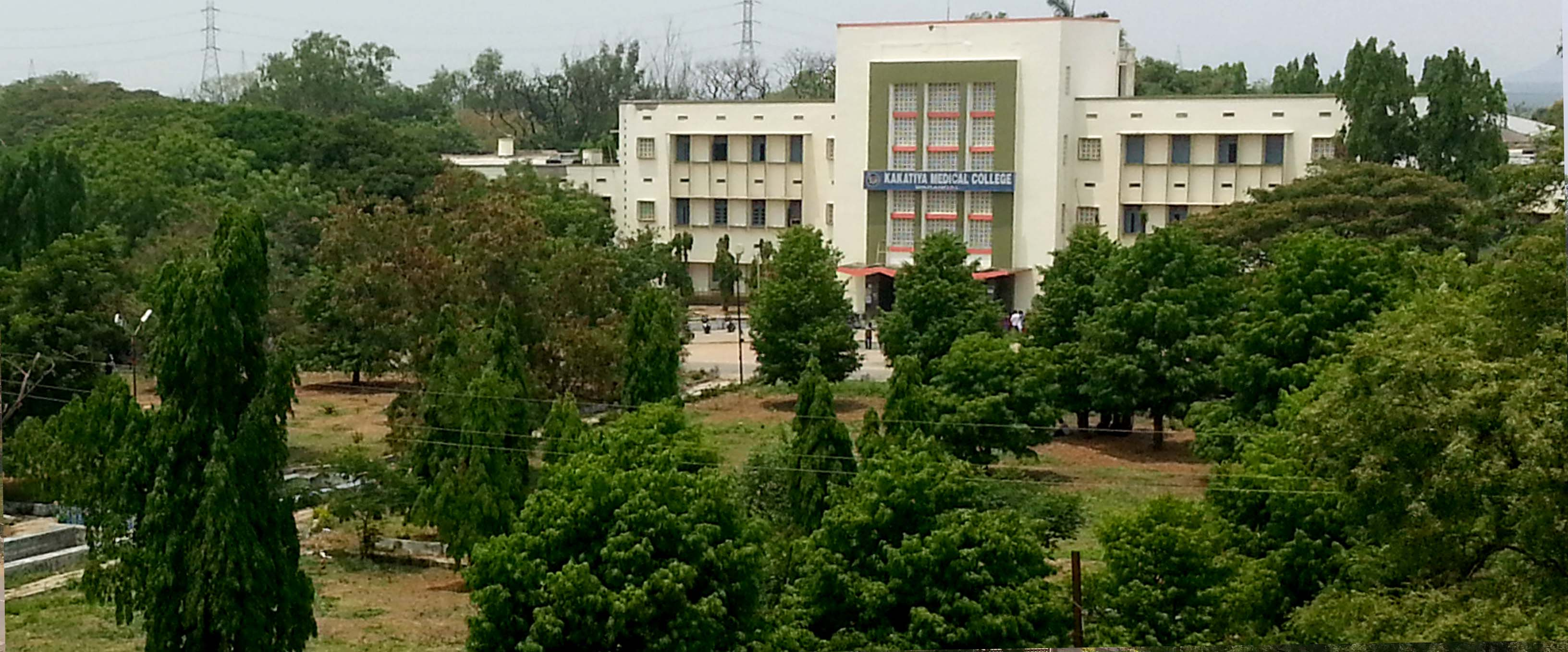
Kakatiya Medical College

Both government and private institutions have their presence in the city. On 2 September 2022, Warangal joined the UNESCO Global Network of Learning Cities (GNLC).

=== Universities and colleges ===
- Kakatiya Institute of Technology and Science
- Kakatiya Medical College
- Kakatiya University
- Kaloji Narayana Rao University of Health Sciences
- National Institute of Technology, Warangal
- SR University
- Vaagdevi College of Engineering

=== Schools ===
- Delhi Public School, Warangal
- Hyderabad Public School
- Platinum Jubilee High School
- St. Gabriel's High School

== Culture ==
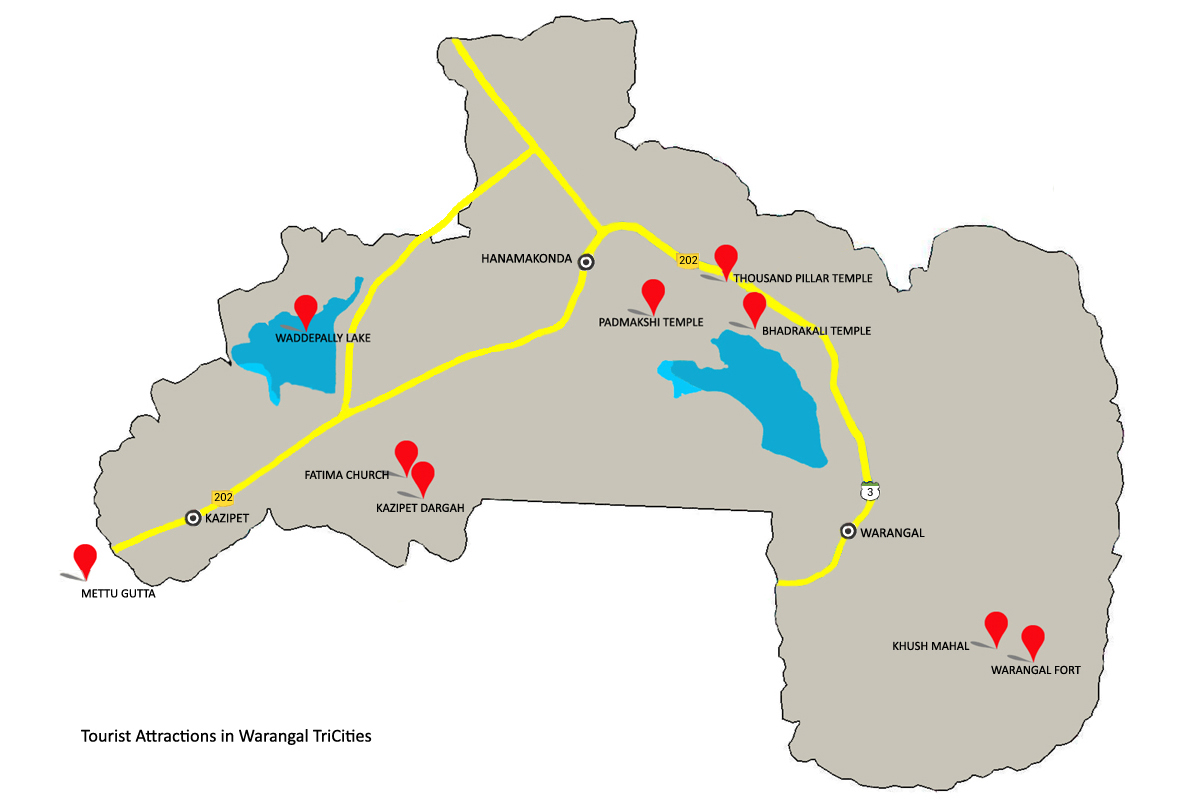
few tourist attraction spots in Warangal Tri-Cities

The residents of the city are often referred as Warangalites. The Warangal Fort, Thousand Pillar Temple and the Ramappa Temple are included in the list of World Heritage Sites recognised by UNESCO. Bhadrakali Temple, Padmakshi Temple, Mettu Gutta, Govinda Rajula Gutta, Roman Catholic Diocese of Warangal, Kazipet Dargah, Ursu Gutta, and Erragattu Gutta are the other notable destinations of various religions. Bhadrakali Lake, Waddepally Lake, and Dharmasagar Lake are the water bodies notable for tourism.

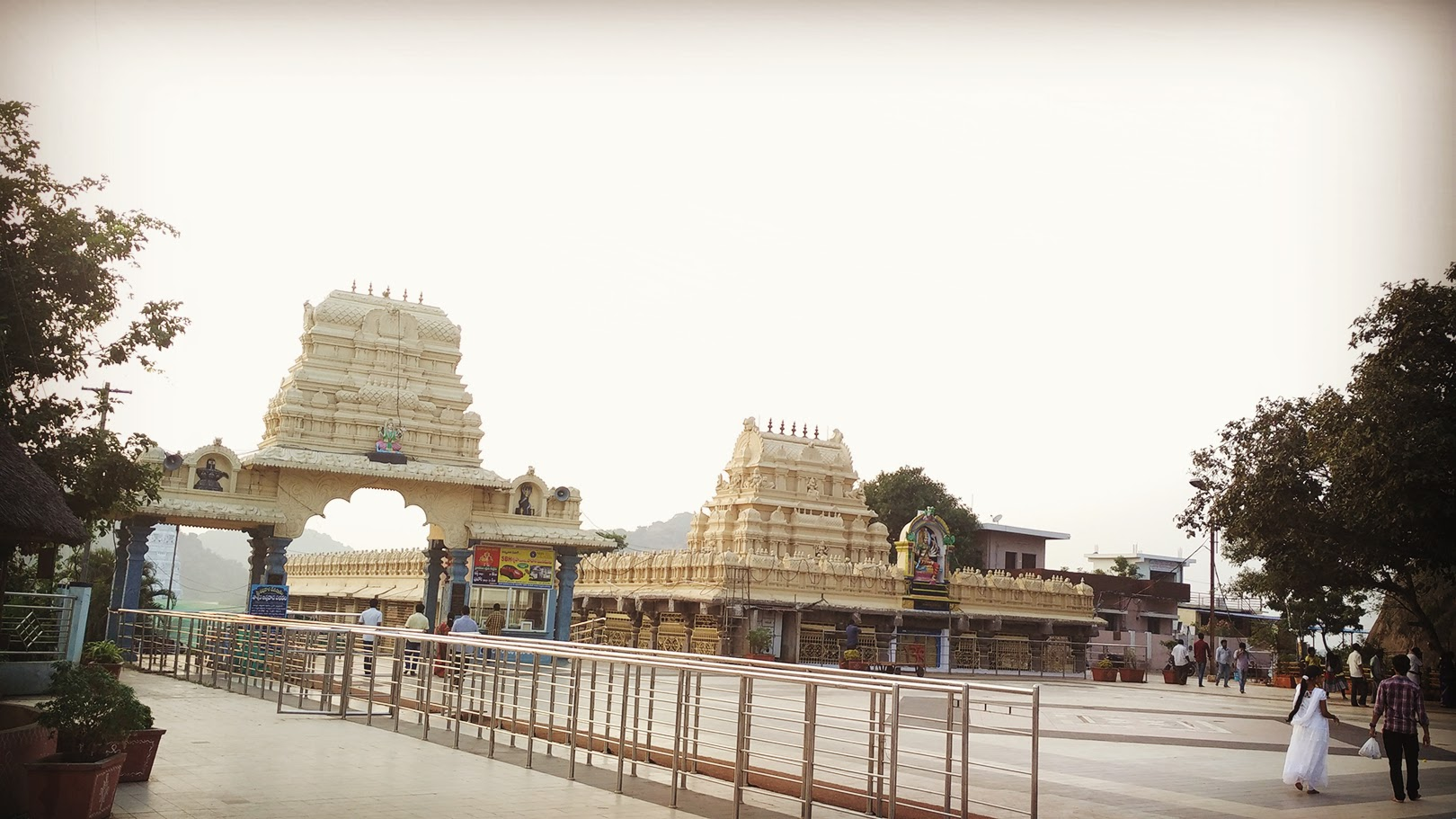
Bhadrakali Temple in Warangal

Bhadrakali Temple lake is being developed into the largest first Geo-Bio-Diversity cultural park in the country, with promenades, historic caves, suspension bridges, natural trails, nesting ground and ecological reserves.

The Ministry of Tourism awarded Warangal as the best heritage city, at the National Tourism Awards for the year 2014–2015. This is the third time in a row for the city to get this award.

=== Festivals ===
Festivals in the city include, a floral festival of Bathukamma being celebrated by women of the city, worshiping the goddess with different flowers for nine days. The women carry their Bathukamma to the nearest temple of their locality, then they clap, sing and dance rhythmically around the Bathukamma. Along with Bathukamma, Bonalu is also declared as a state festival on 15 June 2014. Other festivals are, Sammakka Saralamma Jatara (Medaram Jatara), a popular religious congregation in the honour of Goddess at Medaram of Warangal district.

=== Cuisine ===
The cuisine of the city is mainly of Deccan dishes. Breakfast items include Idli, Dosa, Wada and Puri . Rice with a variety of curries including curd is consumed as the main meal.

== Notable people ==
- Anandhi, film actress
- Tharun Bhascker, film director and actor
- Chakri, music director
- Chandrabose, lyricist
- Daasarathi, poet
- Rudrama Devi, the only woman to rule over Telugu region
- Manisha Eerabathini, playback singer
- Arjun Erigaisi, chess grandmaster
- Kothapalli Jayashankar, professor
- Manju Latha Kalanidhi journalist
- Nand Kishore, cricketer
- Nerella Venu Madhav, impressionist and ventriloquist
- Pothana, poet
- Chukka Ramaiah, educationist
- Kaloji Narayana Rao, poet
- P. V. Narasimha Rao, former Prime Minister of India
- Eesha Rebba, film actress
- Rudradeva (r. c. 1158-1195), the first Kakatiya king who ruled parts of the present-day Telangana and Andhra Pradesh
- Palkuriki Somanatha
- Sandeep Reddy Vanga, film director
