= Kazipet =

- Tri-City
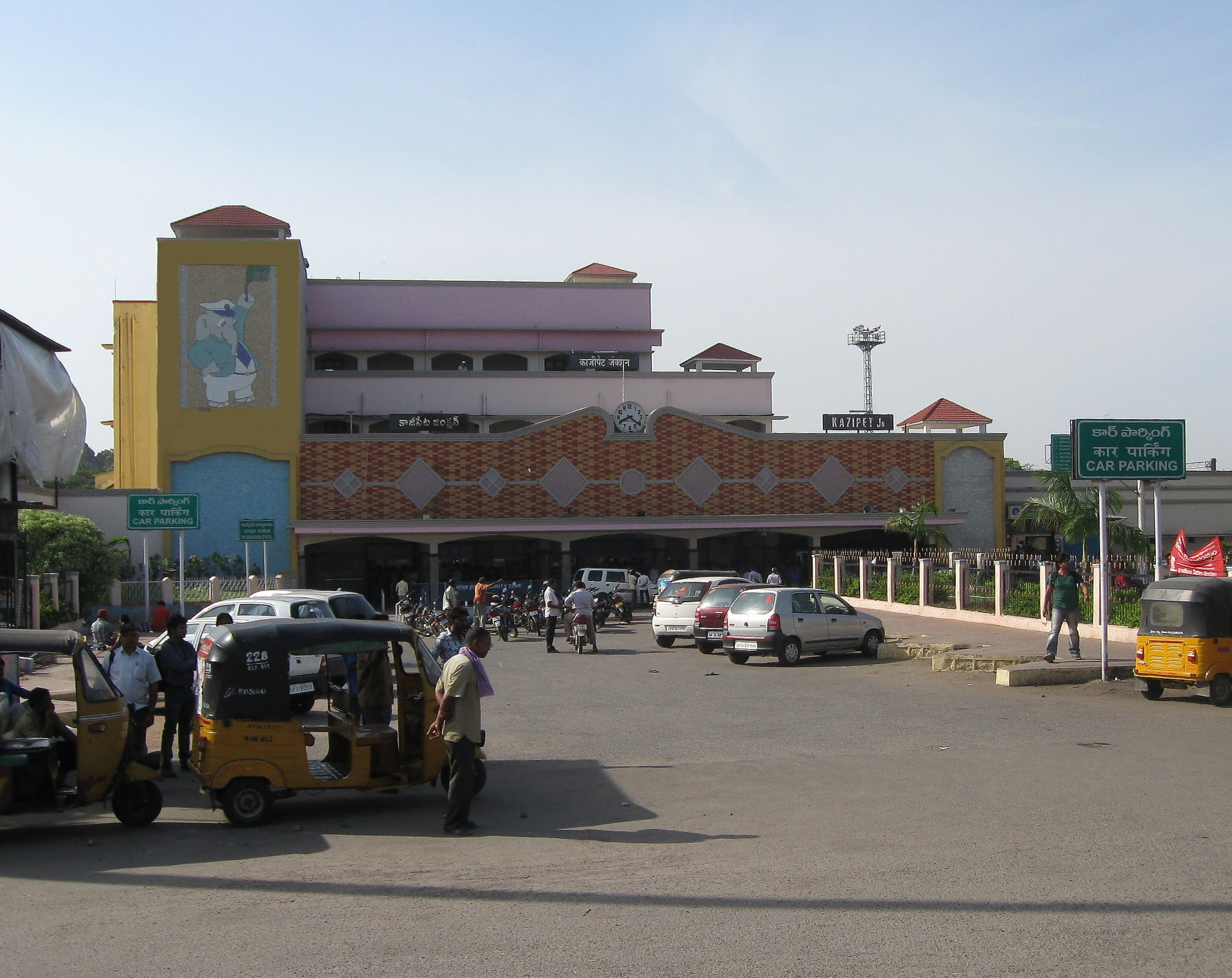
- A view of the main entrance of Kazipet Railway Station

- Location in Telangana, India Kazipet (India)
- Coordinates: 17°58′00″N 79°30′00″E
- Country: India
- State: Telangana
- Founded: 1856

Government
  - Type: Municipal Corporation
  - Body: GWMC; KUDA

Area
  - Total: 43.4 km^{2} (16.8 sq mi)
- Elevation: 304 m (997 ft)

Languages
  - Official: Telugu
- Time zone: UTC+5:30 (IST)
- PIN Code: 506003
- Telephone code: +91–870
- Vehicle registration: TG–03
- Website: telangana.gov.in

Kazipet is the major educational and transport hub in Hanumakonda district in the Indian state of Telangana. It is about 15 Kilometeres away from Warangal It is one of the tri-city along with Warangal and Hanmakonda. Kazipet railway station is one of the major junction between Hyderabad and Vijayawada

== Neighborhoods ==
Neighborhoods in Kazipet include:

- Bodagutta
- Somidi
- Ammavaripet
- Madikonda
- Shayampet
- Tharalapalli
- Rampur
- Kadipikonda
- Kothapalli
- Bapuji Nagar

== Railway junction ==
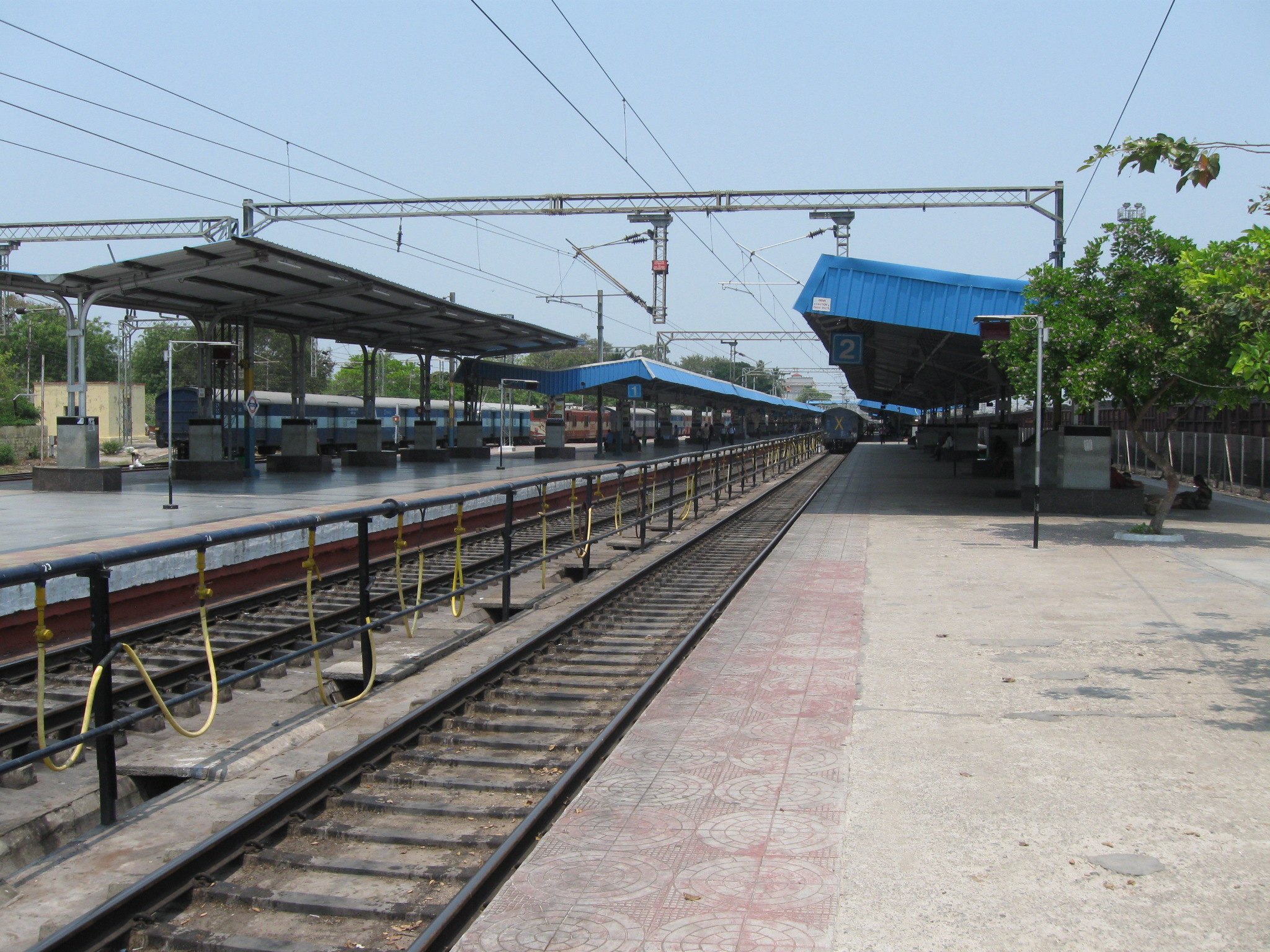
Platforms 1 and 2 and 3 at Kazipet Junction Railway Station

Kazipet railway station is an important station that connects North and South India, and hosts a locomotive (largely diesel) maintenance division.

In October 2023, the Hadapsar-Hyderabad Express was extended to Kazipet.

== Geography ==
Local streets include Bapuji Nagar, Bhavani Nagar, Balaji Nagar, Diesel Colony, Prasanth Nagar, Rahmath Nagar, Siddhartha Nagar, Somidi, Venkatadri Nagar, Vidhyanagar Vishunupuri and Jublee Market.

== Culture ==
Syed Shah Afzal Biabani (1795 – 1856 A.D / 1210 – 26 Safar, 1272 AH) was a Sufi from Warangal, Hyderabad State (now Kazipet 132 km from Hyderabad, India). He was appointed Kazi of Warangal during the reign of Nizam Ali Khan (Asaf Jah II). Thus the name Kazipet. His dargah is among Warangal's pilgrimage centers.

The word "Biabani" indicates a type of rural area in Persian and Urdu. He received this nickname because he spent 12 years in Tasawwuf (a form of Sufi meditation) in the caves located in the forest of Battupalli near Kazipet.
