= Greater Warangal Municipal Corporation =

Local civic body in Warangal, Telangana, India

- Seal of the Greater Warangal Municipal Corporation

Type
- Type: Municipal corporation

Leadership
- Mayor: Gundu Sudha Rani (INC) since 7 May 2021
- Deputy Mayor: Rizwana Shameem (INC) since 7 May 2021
- Municipal Commissioner: Ms. Chahat Bajpai,IAS

Structure
- Seats: 66
- Political groups: Government (48): BRS (48); Opposition (18): BJP (10); INC (4); IND (4)

Meeting place
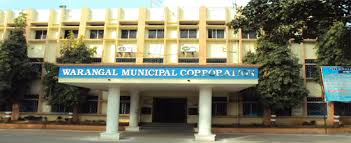
- GWMC Building

Website
- www.gwmc.gov.in

The Greater Warangal Municipal Corporation (GWMC) is the civic body of Warangal. Its geographical area covers most of that administered by the Kakatiya Urban Development Authority.

== History ==
Warangal Municipality being one of the oldest in the state was a major municipality in 1844 Fasli. In July 1959 it was upgraded as a special grade municipality, in July 1960 into a selection grade, and then on 18 August 1994 it was declared as municipal corporation. On 28 January 2015, it is upgraded to Greater municipal corporation by Government of Telangana.

== Smart City ==
The citizens of Warangal can hope for better facilities as the Central government shortlisted it under the Smart Cities Mission. The program enables the city to secure funds from the central government in strengthening and extension of existing services and its infrastructure.

=== Clean Cities Championship ===
In 2012, the city of Warangal was generating 300 tonnes per day (TPD) of municipal solid waste (MSW) of which about 60% was being collected by the GWMC. The residual MSW was piling up across the city, making it look untidy and creating an unsanitary environment. In these conditions, the GWMC devised an innovative solution to addressing MSW management – the Clean Cities Championship. Taking place over one week in mid October 2012, the GWMC invited waste management professionals from 57 municipalities across the state of Telangana to compete in the Clean Cities Championship.

Leading up to the event, a multi-channel information and education campaign (IEC) created awareness and excitement about the event via billboards, posters, pamphlets, radio jingles, TV ads, street plays, a web portal and TV shows.

All the Clean Cities Championship participants were divided into 386 teams, with each team being given the responsibility of waste collection from 500 households per day. The teams went door-to-door and demonstrated correct waste segregation techniques to the householders and gave them two bins, one each for wet and dry waste. Each team spent about fours hours per day collecting MSW from households on its route. The waste was then taken to central drop-off points where it was weighed and further segregated as required. The segregated waste was then taken to waste recovery facilities, which had been prepped ahead of time, here the organic waste underwent bio-methanation or composting, the recyclable waste was sorted and recycled and the inert waste was sent to Marikonda dumpsite 15 kilometers outside the city.

National Cadet Corps (NCC) cadets were the monitors of the competition and marked the waste collection teams on attributes such as gloves worn, masks worn, etc. Each day one man and one woman from across all the teams won a prize. At the end of the week, the best team (Khammam Municipal Corporation) won the Clean Cities Championship trophy.

Following the Clean Cities Championship, Warangal became the first city in India to achieve 100% door-to-door MSW collection. About 70% of households started practicing two-bin MSW segregation into wet and dry waste. 420 cement bins and 128 dumpsters were removed from locations across Warangal making it a no dump city.

GWMC was able to reduce the MSW going to landfill by 30% to 40% and the dumpyard with significantly reduced load is, in phases, being converted into a nature park with vermicomposting sheds.

== Administration ==
=== Jurisdiction ===
Greater Warangal Municipal Corporation (GWMC) Inclusion of 42 Gram Panchayats into the limits.

- Allipur
- Nakkalapally
- Ayhodhyapuram
- Tekulagudem
- Bhattupalli
- Taralapally
- Kadipikonda
- Thimmapur
- Kummarigudem
- Bheemaram
- Paidipally
- Devannapet
- Chinthagattu
- Hasanparthy
- Pegadapally
- Komatipally
- Yellapur
- Mucherla
- Mogilicherla
- Munipally
- Rampur
- Dharmaram
- Vanagapahad
- Dupakunta
- Gundlasingaram
- Gorrekunta
- Kothapeta
- Potharajpally
- Palivelpula
- Stambhampally
- Arepally
- Vasanthapur
- Enumamula
- Janpaka
- Gopalapuram
- Unikicherla
- Kothapally (H)
- Singaram
- Madikonda
- Bollikunta
- Mamunoor
- Gadepallly

=== Politics ===
Political party performance in 2016:

S.No.	Party name	Party flag	No. of Corporators
01	Telangana Rashtra Samithi (TRS)		44
02	Indian National Congress (INC)		04
03	Bharatiya Janata Party (BJP)		01
04	Communist Party of India (Marxist) (CPI(M))		01
05	Others		08

== List of Mayors ==
No.	Name	Term start	Term end	Party	Ref.
Warangal Corporation
1	T. Rajeshwar Rao			Bharatiya Janata Party	
2	Errabelli Swarna			Indian National Congress	
Greater Warangal Municipal Corporation
1	Nannapuneni Narender	15 March 2016		Bharat Rashtra Samithi	
2	Gunda Prakash Rao	27 April 2019		Bharat Rashtra Samithi	
3	Gundu Sudha Rani	7 May 2021	Incumbent	Bharat Rashtra Samithi	
