= Marripalligudem =

Marripalligudem Buttareddygudem Marrypallygudem
- village
- Location in Telangana, India
- Coordinates: 18°14′15.4752″N 079°33′22.0644″E
- Country: India
- State: Telangana
- District: Karimnagar
- Mandal: Kamalapur
- Elevation: 251 m (823 ft)

Population
  - Total: 4,584

Languages
  - Languages: Telugu and Urdu
- Time zone: UTC+5:30 (IST)
- PIN: 505102
- Website: marripallygudem.com

Marripelligudem is a village in Kamalapur Mandal in Hanamakonda of Telangana, India.

Marripelligudem Pin code is 505102.
This Place is in the border of the Hanamakonda District and Karimnagar District.
