= Kakatiya Trikutalayam Mutharam =

12th-13th century Indian temple

Coordinates: 17.7319°N 79.2340°E

Mutharam 500 Pillar Temple
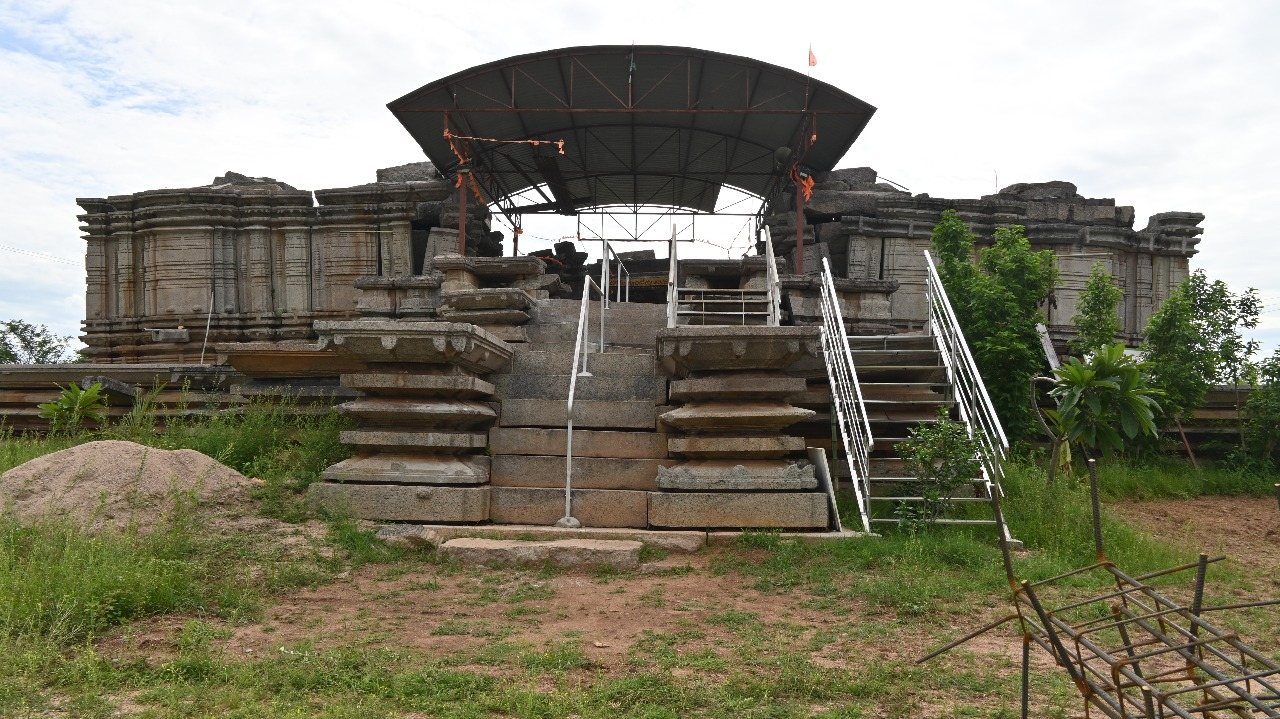
- Mutharam Trikutalayam (500 Pillar Temple)

Religion
- Affiliation: Hinduism
- Deity: Mahamrityunjaya, Suryeshwara, Vishnu

Location
- Location: Mutharam, Bheemadevarpally mandal, Hanamkonda district, Telangana
- State: Telangana
- Country: India
- Interactive map of Mutharam 500 Pillar Temple

Architecture
- Creator: Kakatiya dynasty
- Completed: Kakatiya era

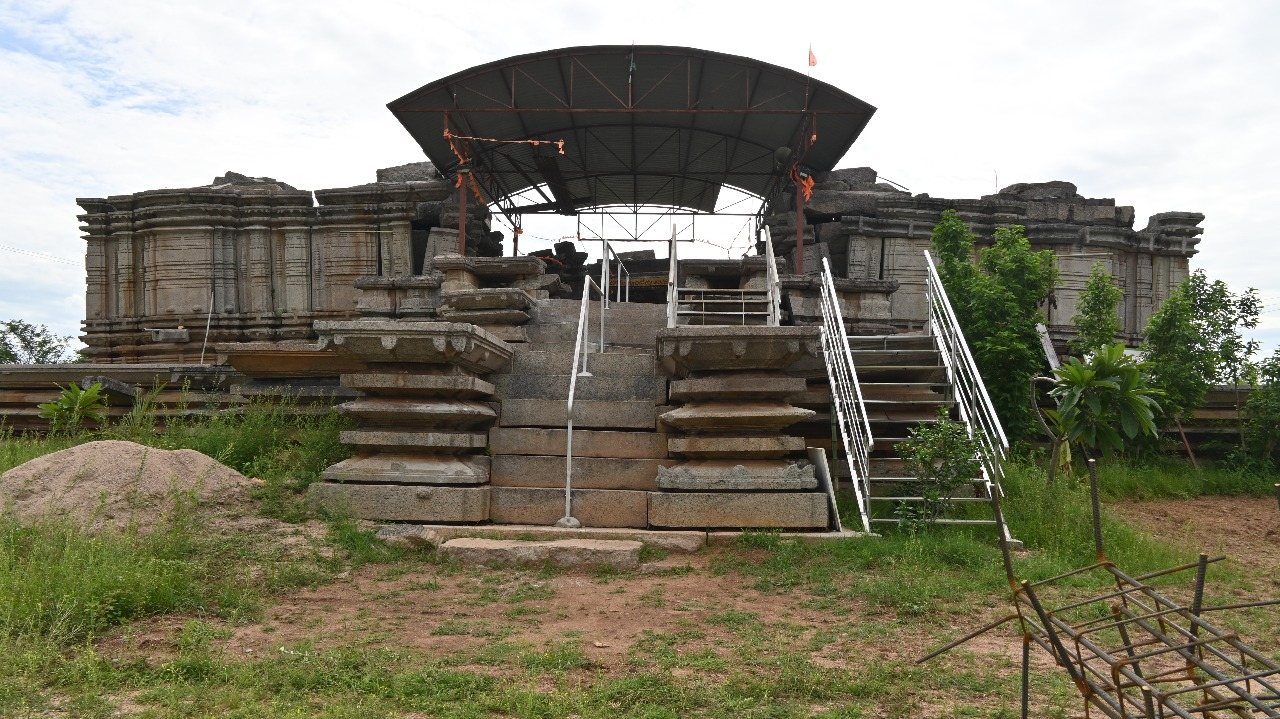
Mutharam Trikutalayam (500 Pillar Temple)

The Kakatiya Trikutalayam, Mutharam is a 12th–13th century trikutalayam temple located in Mutharam village of Bheemadevarpally mandal, Hanamkonda district, Telangana, India. Built during the Kakatiya dynasty, the temple is considered a miniature version of the Thousand Pillar Temple in Warangal, featuring about 500 intricately carved pillars. It consists of three sanctums: two dedicated to Shiva as Mahamrityunjaya and Suryeshwara, and one to Vishnu, which enshrines a six to seven feet tall idol. The temple stands on a star-shaped platform and reflects the architectural style of the Kakatiyas.

== History ==
The temple is believed to have been constructed during the Kakatiya dynasty in the 12th–13th centuries CE. Mutharam was an important religious and cultural site during the Kakatiya period. The temple was also constructed following the Kakatiya TTT model (tank–temple–town concept), wherein a tank was built first to meet the water needs, followed by the temple, around which the settlement developed.

== Architecture ==
- The temple is a trikutalayam built on an elevated star-shaped platform.
- A common hall connects the three garbhagrihas (sanctums).
- Two of the shrines enshrine carved lingams named *Mahamrityunjaya* and *Suryeshwara*, dating back to the Kakatiya era.
- The third shrine, dedicated to Vishnu, is currently closed. It houses a 6–7 feet tall intricately carved idol of Vishnu, with Brahma and Garuda at his feet, and attendants (paricharikas) standing on either side. Vishnu holds a conch (shankha), discus (chakra), and mace (gada) in his four hands, symbolising Kakatiya iconography.
- The temple comprises about 500 pillars, each bearing unique carvings.

== Comparisons ==
- The temple is regarded as a miniature version of the Thousand Pillar Temple.
- Similar trikutalayam temples once existed at *Nidigonda* and *Kondaparthy*, though many have been reduced to ruins.

== Cultural significance ==
- Festivals such as Maha Shivaratri are celebrated here.
- It remains a local pilgrimage centre of importance.

== Current status ==
- The temple is in a dilapidated state, though restoration potential has been highlighted by researchers.
- The Government of Telangana has included the Mutharam Trikutalayam in tourism development plans.

== Gallery ==
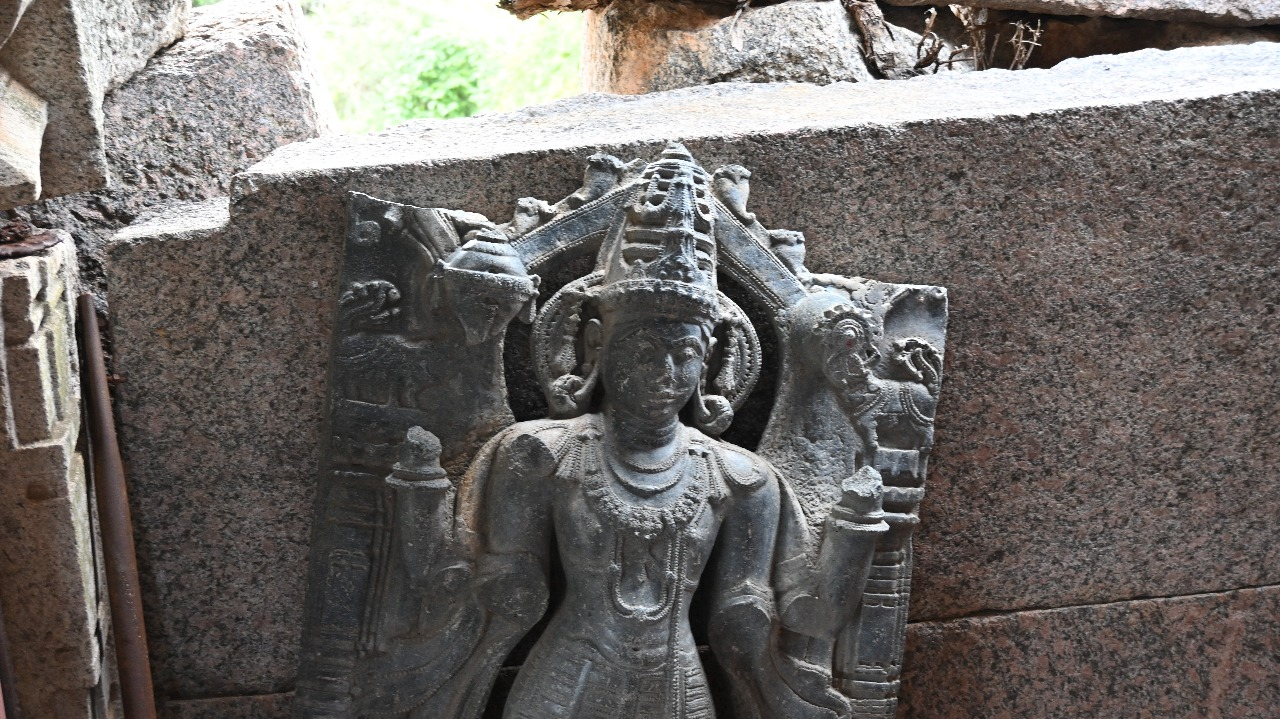
Vishnu idol at Mutharam Trikutalayam

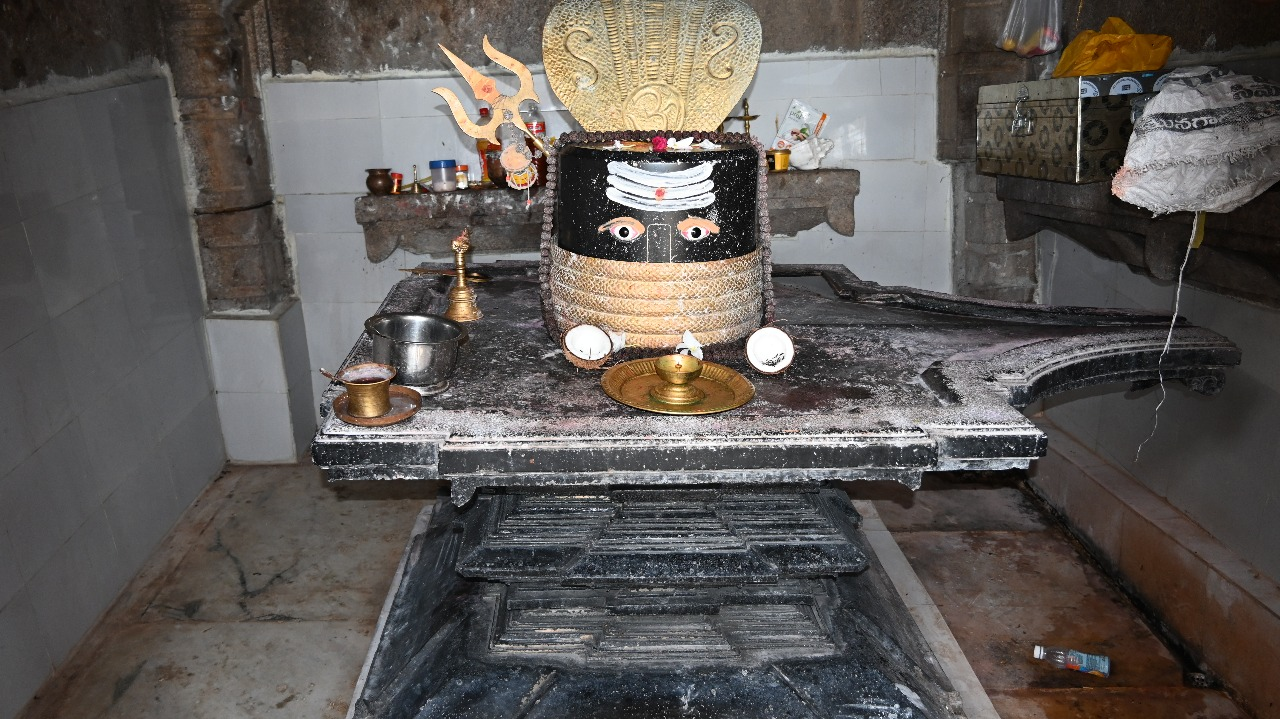
Shiva linga at Mutharam Trikutalayam

== See also ==
- Thousand Pillar Temple
- Kakatiya architecture
- Warangal Fort
