= Lingamori gudem =

Village in India

Lingamori Gudem is a village in the Inavolu mandal, Hanamkonda district of Telangana, India.
