= Tula Uma =

Indian politician

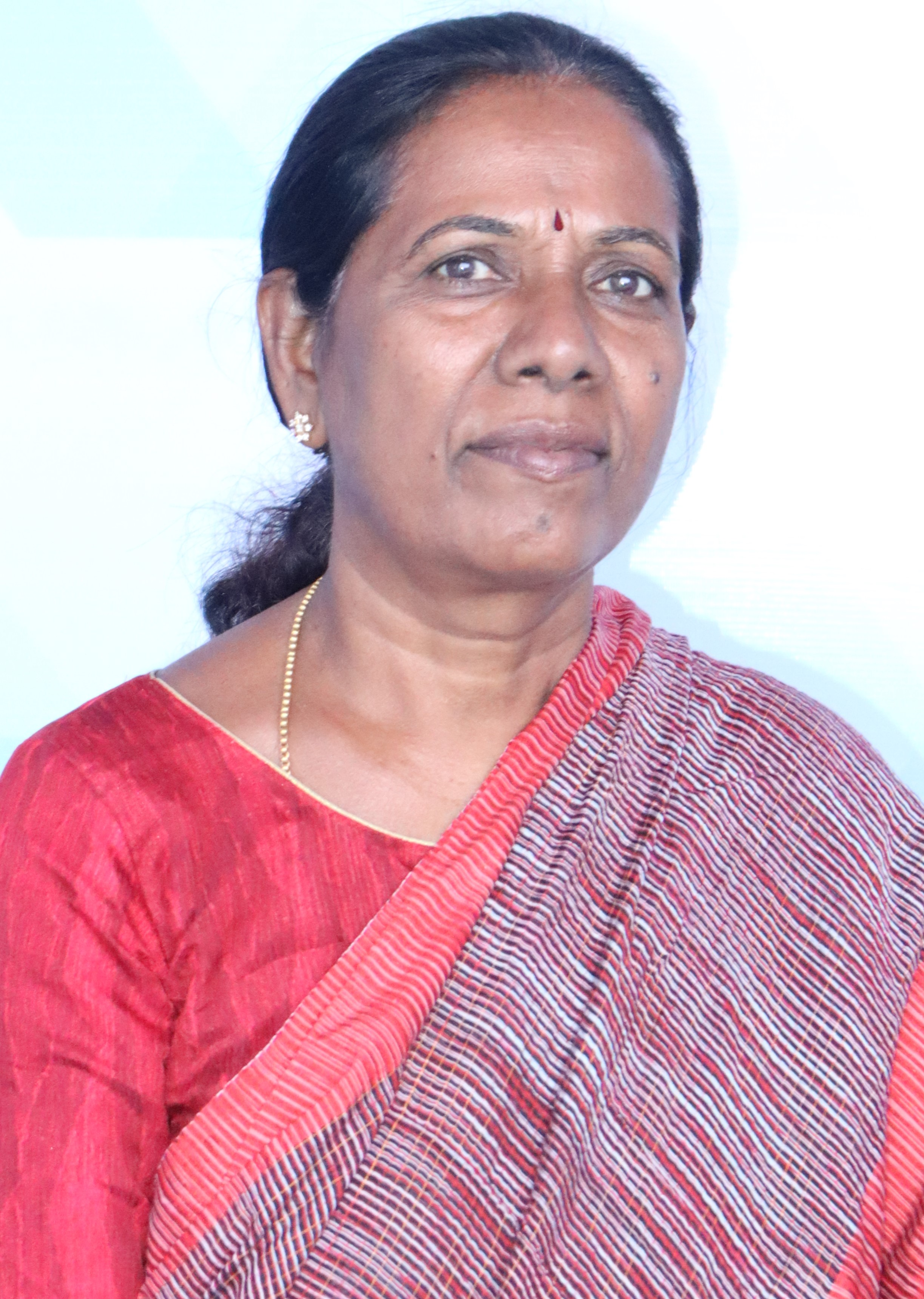
- Tula Uma

Ex ZP Chairperson of Karimnagar
- Incumbent
- Assumed office 5 July 2014 - 2019

Personal details
- Party: Bharat Rashtra Samithi
- Other political affiliations: Bharatiya Janata Party (2021–2023)

Tula Uma is an Indian politician from Bharat Rashtra Samithi (BRS) from the state of Telangana. She is the first woman ZP chairperson of Karimnagar District and the state mahila president of the Telangana Rashtra Samithi (TRS), a state party in India. She is a ZPTC from the Kathalapur mandal of Karimnagar District, Telangana.

== Political career ==
Uma took an oath in the coveted ZP chairperson position on 5 July 2014.

In June 2021, she resigned from TRS following a controversial resignation of Etela Rajender. She alleged that the party's leadership is involved in conspiracies separating them from the people of the state. On 14 June, she joined BJP.

Tula Uma has quit the Bharatiya Janata Party and rejoined the Bharat Rashtra Samithi (BRS) ahead of the assembly elections in 2023.
