= Elkathurthy =

- Village
- Interactive map of Elkathurthy
- Coordinates: 18.099518°N 79.443398°E
- Country: India
- State: Telangana
- District: Hanumakonda district
- Talukas: Elkathurthy

Languages
  - Official: Telugu
- Time zone: UTC+5:30 (IST)
- PIN: 505476
- Vehicle registration: TS 03
- Website: telangana.gov.in

Elkathurthy is a village and mandal headquarter in Hanumakonda district of the Indian state of Telangana.

Villages

Total Number of Villages in this Mandal are (13).

1. Baopet
2. Damera
3. Dandepalle
4. Elkathurthy
5. Gopalpur
6. Jeelgul
7. Keshwapur
8. Kothulnaduma
9. Penchakalpeta
10. Suraram
11. Thimmapur
12. Vallabhapur
13. Veeranarayanapur
