= Public Garden, Hanamkonda =

Public park in Hanamkonda, Telangana, India

Public Garden
- Location within Telangana
- Type: Natural Area
- Location: Hanamkonda, Telangana
- Nearest city: Warangal
- Coordinates: 18°00′31″N 79°33′36″E

Public Garden is a public park located in Hanamkonda, Telangana.

Park was developed and created by Collector S. M. Naimuddin Sahib on 19th occasion as per tablet found in park building. Funds have been sanctioned by the government to develop the park, to build a new compound wall around, and a walkers’ track in it.
