= Bornapally =

- Village
- Country: India
- State: Telangana
- District: Karimnagar

Languages
  - Official: Telugu
- Time zone: UTC+5:30 (IST)

Bornapally is a village in Huzurabad mandal in Karimnagar District, Telangana, India.
