= Pamulaparthi =

Pamulaparti or Pamulaparthi (Telugu: పాములపర్తి) is a Telugu surname:

- Pamulaparthi Sadasiva Rao, thinker, philosopher and journalist
- Pamulaparthi Venkata Narasimha Rao, former Prime Minister of India
- Pamulaparthi Venkata Ranga Rao, an Indian politician who belonged to the Indian National Congress and son of P. V. Narasimha Rao.
