= Huzurabad Assembly constituency =

Constituency of the Telangana legislative assembly in India

Coordinates: 18.20°N 79.40°E

Huzurabad
- Constituency No. 31 for the Telangana Legislative Assembly
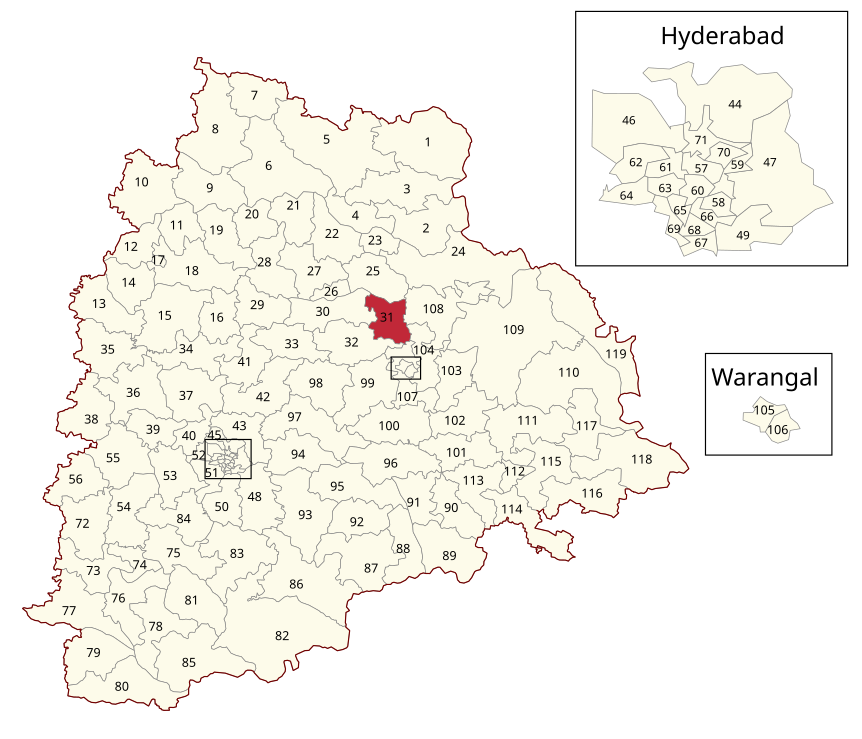
- Location of Huzurabad Assembly constituency within Telangana

Constituency details
- Country: India
- Region: South India
- State: Telangana
- District: Karimnagar
- Lok Sabha constituency: Karimnagar
- Established: 1951
- Total electors: 2,36,872
- Reservation: None

Member of Legislative Assembly
- 3rd Telangana Legislative Assembly
- Incumbent Kaushik Reddy
- Party: BRS
- Elected year: 2023

Huzurabad is a constituency of the Telangana Legislative Assembly. It is in Karimnagar district and partly in Hanamkonda district. It is part of Karimnagar Lok Sabha constituency.

In 2021, the seat was vacated following the resignation of Etela Rajender and again re-elected on 2 November.

== Mandals ==
The assembly constituency currently comprises the following mandals:

Mandal	District
Huzurabad	Karimnagar
Jammikunta	Karimnagar
Veenavanka	Karimnagar
Illanthakunta	Karimnagar
Kamalapur	Hanamkonda

== Members of Legislative Assembly ==
Year	Member	Political party
Hyderabad State
1952	Ponnamaneni Narayan Rao	Indian National Congress
1952	J Venkatesam	Socialist Party
Andhra Pradesh
1957	P. Narsing Rao	Independent
1962	Gadipalli Ramulu	Indian National Congress
1967	N. R. Polsani	Indian National Congress
1972	Vodithela Rajeswar Rao	Indian National Congress
1978	Duggirala Venkatarao	Indian National Congress
1983	Kotha Raji Reddy	Telugu Desam Party
1985	Duggirala Venkatarao	Telugu Desam Party
1989	Kethiri Sai Reddy	Independent
1994	E. Peddi Reddy	Telugu Desam Party
1999	E. Peddi Reddy	Telugu Desam Party
2004	V. Lakshmikantha Rao	Telangana Rashtra Samithi
2008 (Note: By-Election)	V. Lakshmikantha Rao	Telangana Rashtra Samithi
2009	Etela Rajender	Telangana Rashtra Samithi
2010 (Note: By-Election)	Etela Rajender	Telangana Rashtra Samithi
Telangana
2014	Etela Rajender	Telangana Rashtra Samithi
2018	Etela Rajender	Telangana Rashtra Samithi
2021 (Note: By-Election)	Etela Rajender	Bharatiya Janata Party
2023	Padi Kaushik Reddy	Telangana Rashtra Samithi

== Election results ==
=== Telangana Legislative Assembly Election, 2023 ===
Telangana Assembly Elections, 2023: Huzurabad (Assembly constituency)
Party	Candidate	Votes	%	±%
BRS	Kaushik Reddy	80,333	38.38	
BJP	Etela Rajendar	63,460	30.32	
INC	Vodithala Pranav	53,164	25.4	
BSP	Palle Prashanth Goud	2,150	1.03	
NOTA	None of the Above	1,208	0.58	
Majority		16,873	8.06	
Turnout		2,09,311		
BRS gain from BJP		Swing		

=== 2021 by-election ===
By-elections, 2021: Huzurabad
Party	Candidate	Votes	%	±%
BJP	Etela Rajender	107,022	51.96	+51.01
TRS	Gellu Srinivas Yadav	83,167	40.38	−18.96
INC	Balmoor Venkat	3,014	1.46	−33.14
NOTA	None of the above	1,036	0.50	−1.12
Majority		23,855	11.58	
Turnout		2,06,013	86.92	
BJP gain from TRS		Swing		

=== Telangana Legislative Assembly election, 2018 ===
Telangana Assembly Elections, 2018: Huzurabad (Assembly constituency)
Party	Candidate	Votes	%	±%
TRS	Etela Rajender	104,840	59.34	
INC	Kaushik Reddy	61,121	34.60	
NOTA	None of the above	2,867	1.62	
Independent	Barige Gattaiah Yadav	2660	1.51	
BJP	Raghu Puppala	1,683	0.95	
Majority		43,719	24.74	
Turnout		1,76,675	84.40	
TRS hold		Swing		

=== Telangana Legislative Assembly election, 2014 ===
Telangana Assembly Elections, 2014: Huzurabad (Assembly constituency)
Party	Candidate	Votes	%	±%
TRS	Etela Rajender	95,315	58.76	
INC	Kethiri Sudarshan Reddy	38,278	23.60	
TDP	Kashyap Reddy Muddasani	15,642	9.64	
Independent	E. Bheema Rao	5,075	3.13	
RPI(A)	Myakamalla Rathnaiah	1,992	1.23	
Pyramid Party of India	Chintha Anilkumar	1,711	1.05	
BSP	Kothuri Ramesh	1,479	0.91	
NOTA	None of the above	1,445	0.89	
Majority		57,037	35.16	
Turnout		1,62,201	77.32	
TRS hold		Swing		

=== 2010 by-election ===
By-election, 2010: Huzurabad
Party	Candidate	Votes	%	±%
TRS	Etela Rajender	93,026	67.36	
TDP	Muddasani Damodar Reddy	13,799	9.99	
INC	V. K. Mohan Rao	12,540	9.08	
Majority		79,227	55.36	
Turnout		1,43,122	70.73	
TRS hold		Swing		

=== Andhra Pradesh Assembly election 2009 ===
Andhra Pradesh Assembly Elections, 2009: Huzurabad (Assembly constituency)
Party	Candidate	Votes	%	±%
TRS	Etela Rajender	56,752	38.82	
INC	V Krishna Mohan Rao	41,717	28.54	
PRP	Pingili Venkateshwar Reddy	24,785	16.96	
Majority		15,035	10.28	
Turnout		1,46,178	71.64	
TRS hold		Swing		

=== By-election 2008 ===
By-election, 2008: Huzurabad
Party	Candidate	Votes	%	±%
TRS	V. Lakshmikantha Rao	53,547		
INC	K.Sudarshan Reddy	32,727		
Majority		20,820		
Turnout				
TRS hold		Swing		

=== Andhra Pradesh Assembly election 2004 ===
2004 Andhra Pradesh Legislative Assembly election: Huzurabad
Party	Candidate	Votes	%	±%
TRS	V. Lakshmikantha Rao	81,121	62.93	
TDP	Enugala Peddi Reddy	36,451	28.28	
LJP	Enugala Bheema Rao	05,281	4.10	
Majority		44,671		
Turnout		1,28,908		
TRS gain from TDP		Swing		

== See also ==
- Huzurabad
- List of constituencies of Telangana Legislative Assembly
