= Hasanparthi Road railway station =

Railway station in Hasanparthy, India

Hasanparthi Road
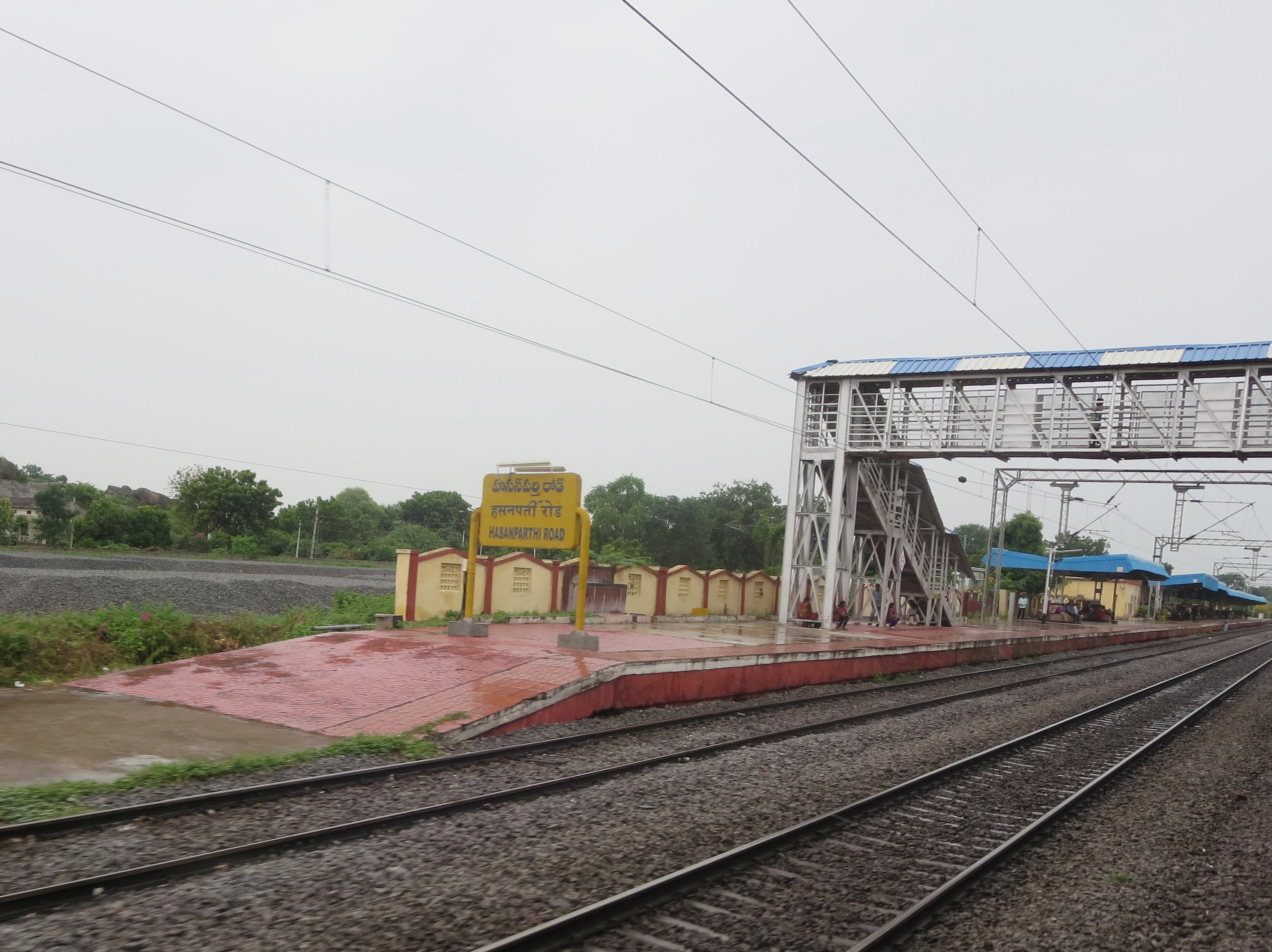
- Hasanparthi Road railway station

General information
- Location: Hasanparthy, Hanumakonda district, Telangana; India
- Coordinates: 18°04′40″N 79°30′08″E
- Elevation: 262 metres (860 ft)
- System: Indian Railways Station
- Owner: Indian Railways
- Platforms: 3

Construction
- Structure type: Standard (on ground station)
- Parking: No
- Cycle facilities: No

Other information
- Status: Active
- Station code: HSP
- Division(s): Secunderabad
- Fare zone: South Central Railway zone

Passengers
- less

Services
passenger trains
Location
- Location within Telangana Location within India

Hasanparthi Road railway station (station code:HSP) is located at Hasanparthy in Warangal, Telangana.

It is under the administration of South Central Railway zone, Indian Railway.

Kazipet Junction and Uppal railway station are the nearby railway station.
