= Kamalapur, Andhra Pradesh Assembly constituency =

Coordinates: 18.18°N 79.53°E

Kamalapur
- Former constituency for the State Legislative Assembly

Constituency details
- Country: India
- State: United Andhra Pradesh
- District: Karimnagar
- Abolished: 2008

Kamalapur Assembly constituency is a former constituency of Andhra Pradesh Legislative Assembly in United Andhra Pradesh. In 2008, it was dissolved and merged with Huzurabad constituency. It was a part of Karimnagar district, in present-day Telangana.

== Members of the Legislative Assembly ==
Election	Member	Party
1962	K. V. Narayan Reddy	Independent politician
1967	K. V. Narayan Reddy	Indian National Congress
1972	P. Janardhan Reddy	Independent politician
1978	P. Janardhan Reddy	Janata Party
1983	Madadi Ramachandra Reddy	Indian National Congress
1985	Muddasani Damodar Reddy	Telugu Desam Party
1989	Muddasani Damodar Reddy	Telugu Desam Party
1994	Muddasani Damodar Reddy	Telugu Desam Party
1999	Muddasani Damodar Reddy	Telugu Desam Party
2004	Etela Rajender	Bharat Rashtra Samithi
2008 By-election	Etela Rajender	Bharat Rashtra Samithi

== Election results ==
=== Assembly By-election 2008 ===
2008 Andhra Pradesh Legislative Assembly by-election : Kamalapur, Andhra Pradesh
Party	Candidate	Votes	%	±%
BRS	Etela Rajender	54,092	44.54%	▼7.90
TDP	Muddasani Damodar Reddy	31,808	26.19%	New
INC	Paripati Ravindar Reddy	25,152	20.71%	New
Independent	Enugala Bheema Rao	7,880	6.49%	New
Independent	Lingampalli Srinivas Reddy	2,523	2.08%	New
Margin of victory		22,284	18.35%	▲3.31
Turnout		121,455	64.70%	▼6.32
Total valid votes		121,455		
Registered electors		187,708		▲2.21
BRS hold		Swing	▼7.90	

=== Assembly Election 2004 ===
2004 Andhra Pradesh Legislative Assembly election : Kamalapur, Andhra Pradesh
Party	Candidate	Votes	%	±%
BRS	Etela Rajender	68,393	52.44%	New
TDP	Muddasani Damodar Reddy	48,774	37.40%	▼16.53
LJP	Palkala Veera Raghava Reddy	8,821	6.76%	New
BSP	Buchaiah Marapally	1,751	1.34%	▲0.55
JP	Bobbala Raji Reddy	821	0.63%	New
Margin of victory		19,619	15.04%	▲0.91
Turnout		130,415	71.02%	▼0.64
Total valid votes		130,414		
Rejected ballots		1	0.00%	▼3.26
Registered electors		183,644		▲11.83
BRS gain from TDP		Swing	▼1.49	

=== Assembly Election 1999 ===
1999 Andhra Pradesh Legislative Assembly election : Kamalapur, Andhra Pradesh
Party	Candidate	Votes	%	±%
TDP	Muddasani Damodar Reddy	61,402	53.93%	▼7.03
INC	Arukala Veeresham	45,310	39.80%	▲4.11
Anna Telugu Desam Party	Nerella Srinivas	2,739	2.41%	New
Marxist Communist Party of India (S.S.Srivastava)	Bodiga Shobha	2,444	2.15%	New
BSP	Bakki Mogili	899	0.79%	▼0.98
Margin of victory		16,092	14.13%	▼11.14
Turnout		117,683	71.66%	▼2.11
Total valid votes		113,851		
Rejected ballots		3,832	3.26%	▲1.28
Registered electors		164,213		▲9.86
TDP hold		Swing	▼7.03	

=== Assembly Election 1994 ===
1994 Andhra Pradesh Legislative Assembly election : Kamalapur, Andhra Pradesh
Party	Candidate	Votes	%	±%
TDP	Muddasani Damodar Reddy	65,889	60.96%	▲9.68
INC	Kethiri Sai Reddy	38,572	35.69%	▼9.10
BSP	Gattu Shankar	1,914	1.77%	New
BJP	Kalakuntla Thirupathamma	1,181	1.09%	New
Margin of victory		27,317	25.27%	▲18.79
Turnout		110,274	73.77%	▲3.80
Total valid votes		108,090		
Rejected ballots		2,184	1.98%	▼2.84
Registered electors		149,478		▲2.71
TDP hold		Swing	▲9.68	

=== Assembly Election 1989 ===
1989 Andhra Pradesh Legislative Assembly election : Kamalapur, Andhra Pradesh
Party	Candidate	Votes	%	±%
TDP	Muddasani Damodar Reddy	49,698	51.28%	▲6.11
INC	Veera Reddy Lingampalli	43,414	44.79%	▲18.87
Independent	Veera Raghavareddy Palakal;a	1,354	1.40%	New
Independent	Mall A. Reddy Yedla	1,121	1.16%	New
Independent	Madadi Ramachandra Reddy	900	0.93%	New
Margin of victory		6,284	6.48%	▼12.76
Turnout		101,834	69.97%	▲3.36
Total valid votes		96,923		
Rejected ballots		4,911	4.82%	▲2.50
Registered electors		145,539		▲20.54
TDP hold		Swing	▲6.11	

=== Assembly Election 1985 ===
1985 Andhra Pradesh Legislative Assembly election : Kamalapur, Andhra Pradesh
Party	Candidate	Votes	%	±%
TDP	Muddasani Damodar Reddy	35,485	45.17%	New
INC	Madadi Ramachandra Reddy	20,367	25.92%	▼16.45
Independent	L. Veera Reddy	19,444	24.75%	New
Independent	Tungutoori Mogilaiah	1,138	1.45%	New
Independent	Bingi Damodhar	1,002	1.28%	New
Margin of victory		15,118	19.24%	▲10.50
Turnout		80,429	66.61%	▲1.15
Total valid votes		78,564		
Rejected ballots		1,865	2.32%	▼0.67
Registered electors		120,738		▲7.66
TDP gain from INC		Swing	▲2.80	

=== Assembly Election 1983 ===
1983 Andhra Pradesh Legislative Assembly election : Kamalapur, Andhra Pradesh
Party	Candidate	Votes	%	±%
INC	Muddasani Damodar Reddy	30,179	42.37%	▲15.12
LKD	P. Janardhan Reddy	23,955	33.64%	New
Independent	B. Damodhar	16,693	23.44%	New
Margin of victory		6,224	8.74%	▲4.68
Turnout		73,413	65.46%	▼10.16
Total valid votes		71,220		
Rejected ballots		2,193	2.99%	▼0.22
Registered electors		112,151		▲5.98
INC gain from JP		Swing	▲8.45	

=== Assembly Election 1978 ===
1978 Andhra Pradesh Legislative Assembly election : Kamalapur, Andhra Pradesh
Party	Candidate	Votes	%	±%
JP	P. Janardhan Reddy	26,269	33.92%	New
INC(I)	Madadi Ramachandra Reddy	23,128	29.86%	New
INC	Kethiri Sai Reddy	21,109	27.25%	▼6.44
Independent	Bingi Damodhar	5,704	7.36%	New
Independent	Kotha Raji Reddy	1,245	1.61%	New
Margin of victory		3,141	4.06%	▼28.57
Turnout		80,021	75.62%	▲2.70
Total valid votes		77,455		
Rejected ballots		2,566	3.21%	▲3.21
Registered electors		105,818		▲29.29
JP gain from Independent		Swing	▼32.39	

=== Assembly Election 1972 ===
1972 Andhra Pradesh Legislative Assembly election : Kamalapur, Andhra Pradesh
Party	Candidate	Votes	%	±%
Independent	P. Janardhan Reddy	38,280	66.31%	New
INC	K. V. Narayan Reddy	19,446	33.69%	▼28.51
Margin of victory		18,834	32.63%	▲2.35
Turnout		59,679	72.92%	▼0.13
Total valid votes		57,726		
Registered electors		81,845		▲17.02
Independent gain from INC		Swing	▲4.11	

=== Assembly Election 1967 ===
1967 Andhra Pradesh Legislative Assembly election : Kamalapur, Andhra Pradesh
Party	Candidate	Votes	%	±%
INC	K. V. Narayan Reddy	30,626	62.20%	▲15.83
Independent	S. R. Madadi	15,716	31.92%	New
ABJS	G. R. Tangeda	2,895	5.88%	New
Margin of victory		14,910	30.28%	▲25.99
Turnout		51,092	73.05%	▲8.10
Total valid votes		49,237		
Registered electors		69,941		▲21.72
INC gain from Independent		Swing	▲11.53	

=== Assembly Election 1962 ===
1962 Andhra Pradesh Legislative Assembly election : Kamalapur, Andhra Pradesh
Party	Candidate	Votes	%	±%
Independent	K. V. Narayan Reddy	18,192	50.67%	New
INC	Polsani Narsinga Rao	16,651	46.37%	New
Independent	Thokala Lakshma Reddy	1,063	2.96%	New
Margin of victory		1,541	4.29%	
Turnout		37,318	64.95%	
Total valid votes		35,906		
Registered electors		57,459		
Independent win (new seat)				
