= Paidipally =

Human settlement in India

Coordinates: 18°00′52″N 79°36′51″E

Paidipally is a village in the Hanamkonda district of Telangana state in India. It is located in outskirts of Warangal City. Paidipally is located in the semi-arid region of Telangana. Paidipally is the part of the Greater Warangal Municipal Corporation as 3rd division It has a population of 12105 as per 2011 census and is in Parkal mandal.
