= Shambunipet =

Shambhunipet
- Location in Telangana, India Shambhunipet (India)
- Coordinates: 17°56′50″N 79°36′05″E
- Country: India
- State: Telangana
- District: Warangal

Languages
  - Official Telugu and urdu: Telugu
- Time zone: UTC+5:30 (IST)
- Postal code: 506005
- Vehicle registration: TS 03

Shambhunipet is a town in Warangal city in the Indian state of Telangana.

== Geography ==
Shambhunipet is located in the southern part of the city of Warangal, within the Warangal Urban district of Telangana State in southern India.

Astronomically, the locality lies at approximately 17.949709° north latitude and 79.599442° east longitude, within the geographical extent of the Deccan Plateau, one of the major plateaus of the southern Indian subcontinent, characterized by its relatively level terrain and moderate elevation above sea level.
