= University Arts and Science College, Warangal =

College in Telangana, India

- Type: College of Arts and Sciences
- Established: 1927
- Affiliations: Kakatiya University
- Location: Subedari, Hanamkonda, Telangana, India; 17.993°N 79.546°E
- Campus: Urban
- Website: kakatiya.ac.in

University Arts & Science College is one of the oldest Arts and Science colleges in Telangana. It is located in Subedari, Hanamakonda. The college offers Undergraduate and Postgraduate courses. It is also called the second campus of the Kakatiya University.

== History ==
Development of this college began in the year 1927, when it was started as Collegiate High School. In 1954 the college was shifted from Government Junior College Buildings, Hanamkonda to its present location. In 1959 the college was upgraded as a constituent college of Osmania University offering undergraduate courses in the faculties of Arts, Science & Commerce. With the establishment of Kakatiya University, the college was transferred from Osmania University to Kakatiya University on 19 August 1976. In 1995 Postgraduate courses were also added.

== Campus ==
College is located in Subedari, Hanamakonda on the National Highway 163, and is well connected by rail and road transport. The College has a sophisticated English Language Laboratory, Library with reading halls and internet facility, Air-conditioned seminar hall, Computer labs, highly sophisticated Biotechnology and Microbiology Laboratories along with regular labs like Physics, Electronics, Chemistry, Botany and Zoology. 70 years old Auditorium and amphitheatre, Health Center, Multi-Gym and a large playground. The entire college campus is covered with a high-speed Internet facility.

== Academics ==
College offers 29 courses & course combinations at Undergraduate and Postgraduate levels which includes – Biotechnology, Business Management, Commerce, Computer Applications, Computer Science, Electronics, Hindi, Human Resource Management, Microbiology, Organic Chemistry, Social Work, and Statistics..

== Notable alumni ==
- Daasarathi, Telugu poet and writer
- Kothapalli Jayashankar, educationalist, activist, professor, former-Vice-Chancellor-Kakatiya University, former registrar-CIEFL-Hyderabad(a.k.a. EFLU).
- Ajit Khan, Hindi actor, who acted for more than 40 years.
- Nand Kishore, an Indian former first-class cricketer.
- Nerella Venu Madhav, mimicry artist
- K. Reuben Mark, the present Bishop in Karimnagar (2015 onwards)
- Kaloji Narayana Rao, Telugu poet and activist.
- P. V. Narasimha Rao, politician, former Prime Minister of India.
- Pamulaparthi Sadasiva Rao, philosopher and freelance journalist.
- Nukala Ramachandra Reddy, politician and freedom fighter.
