= Aggalayya Gutta =

Jain temple in Telangana, India

Coordinates: 18.0002°N 79.5706°E

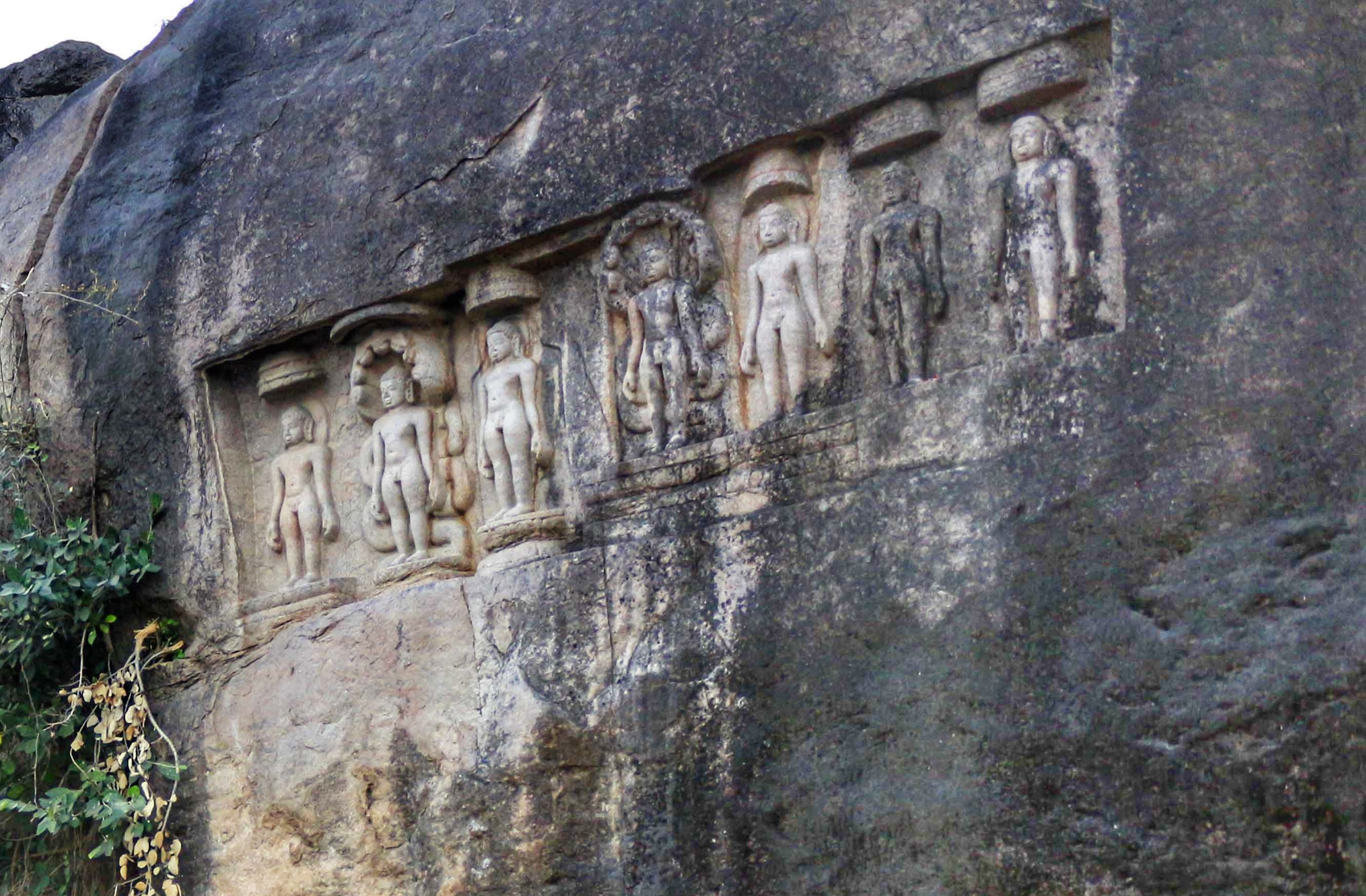
- Jain sculptures at Aggalayya Gutta

Religion
- Affiliation: Jainism
- Sect: Digambara
- Deity: Shantinatha, Parshvanatha

Location
- Location: Hanamkonda, Telangana

Architecture
- Style: Western Chalukya architecture
- Creator: Jayasimha II
- Established: 1034 CE

Aggalayya Gutta (also spelled Aggalaiah Gutta) is a historic Jain site situated on a hillock in Hanamkonda, Telangana, India. The site contains monumental rock-cut images of Jain Tirthankaras, including an approximately 30-foot (9.1 m) image identified as Shantinatha and a 13-foot (4.0 m) image of Parshvanatha.

The hillock is named after Aggalayya, an 11th-century Jain physician and surgeon who served during the reign of the Western Chalukyas. Epigraphic records describe Aggalayya as a specialist in Ayurveda and surgical treatment and record his patronage of Jain temples.

== History ==
Aggalayya was a Jain physician active during the reign of the Western Chalukya ruler Jayasimha II, also known as Jagadekamalla I. A Jain inscription discovered at Saidapur and dated to 4 June 1034 CE describes him as Vaidyaratnakara, Pranacharya and Naravaidya and praises his proficiency in Ayurveda and śastra chikitsa (surgery).

The Saidapur inscription records grants for the maintenance and repair of two Jain temples, the Buddhasena Jinalaya at Mucchanapalli and the Vaidyaratnakara Jinalaya at Ikkuriki. The former had been constructed by Aggalayya, while the latter appears to have been named after his title Vaidyaratnakara. The record also describes his ability to treat diseases considered incurable by other physicians and is notable for its explicit reference to surgical practice in 11th-century Ayurveda.

The Archaeological Survey of India also records the Saidapur inscription as a 1034 CE inscription of Jayasimha II and states that the two Jain basadis mentioned in it were built by Aggalayya. The inscription records his titles and his proficiency in Sastra-vaidya, or treatment by surgical methods.

== Jain sculptures ==
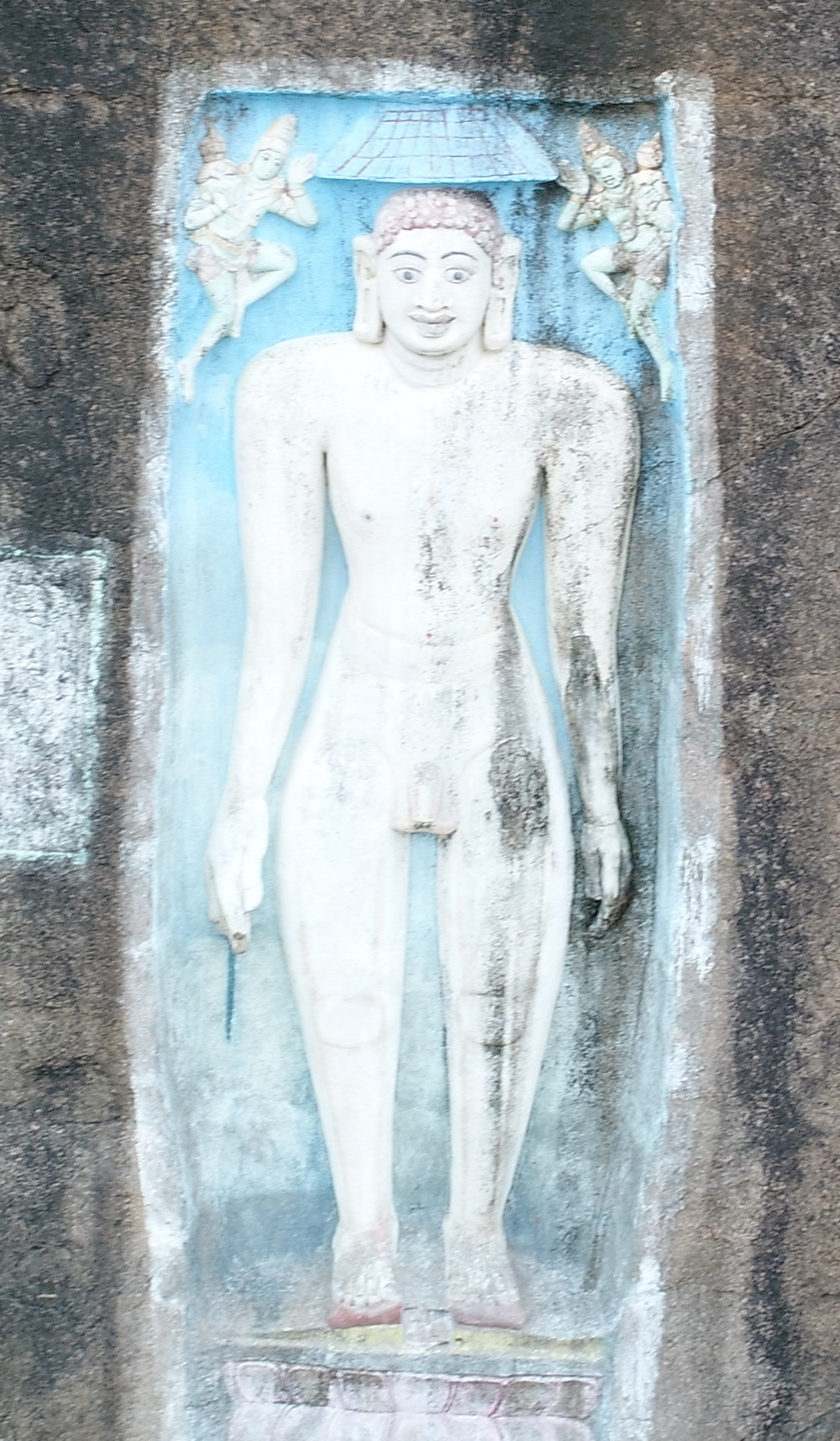
30-foot (9.1 m) rock carved image of Shantinatha

The principal monuments at Aggalayya Gutta are monumental Tirthankara figures carved directly into the rock of the hill. A large figure identified in contemporary sources as the 16th Tirthankara Shantinatha measures approximately 30 feet (9.1 m) in height. Nearby is an approximately 13-foot (4.0 m) carving of Parshvanatha, the 23rd Tirthankara.

The site also contains several other Jain engravings. During development of the hillock as a heritage site, a centuries-old image of Mahavira was reported from inside the hill, and access to the image was subsequently developed.

== Ayurvedic remains ==
Archaeological and historical exploration of the hillock has identified several rock-cut mortars that have been interpreted as having been used in the preparation of medicines. Parts of a stone implement described as a gokarnam, used for administering medicinal preparations, were also reported from the site. Based on these remains and the epigraphic evidence concerning Aggalayya, the hillock has been associated with the practice and teaching of Ayurveda during the 11th century.

The association is significant in the context of Aggalayya's documented career as a physician. The 1034 Saidapur inscription praises his medical knowledge and specifically records his expertise in surgical treatment.

== Conservation and development ==
Aggalayya Gutta was developed as a heritage and tourism site by the Kakatiya Urban Development Authority (KUDA) under the Government of India's Heritage City Development and Augmentation Yojana (HRIDAY). KUDA spent approximately ₹1.3 crore on development of the site, including rock-cut steps providing access to the hilltop, landscaping, lighting and other visitor facilities.

The development project envisaged the site as a Jain Vanam and provided improved access to the Jain sculptures and engravings on the hillock.

== See also ==
- Padmakshi Temple
- Kulpakji
