= Muddasani Damodar Reddy =

Indian politician

Member of the Andhra Pradesh Legislative Assembly for Kamalapur
- In office 1985–2004
- Preceded by: Ramachandra Reddy Madadi
- Succeeded by: Etela Rajender

Personal details
- Died: 9 April 2012 Nizam's Institute of Medical Sciences, Hyderabad, Telangana, India
- Party: Telugu Desam Party
- Children: 1

Muddasani Damodar Reddy (died 9 April 2012) was an Indian politician from the state of Andhra Pradesh. He was a Member of the Legislative Assembly (MLA) from Kamalapur Assembly constituency from Telugu Desam Party and served as a Cabinet Minister in the governments of N. T. Rama Rao and N. Chandrababu Naidu.

== Early life ==
Muddasani Damodar Reddy hailed from Mamidalapalli, Karimnagar district, Andhra Pradesh (now in Telangana). He married Malathi Reddy and has a son, Kashyap Reddy, who is also a politician.

== Political career ==
Muddasani contested and won four consecutive times as the MLA of Kamalapur constituency to Andhra Pradesh Legislative Assembly on behalf of Telugu Desam Party (TDP). In 1985 election, he won against the incumbent MLA Ramachandra Reddy Madadi of Congress party. In 1989 election, he won against Veera Reddy Lingampalli of Congress. In 1994 election, he won against Kethiri Sai Reddy of Congress. In 1999 election, he won against Arakula Veeresham of Congress.

In the 2004 election, he lost to Etela Rajender of Telangana Rashtra Samithi (TRS). In 2009, the Kamalapur constituency was dissolved and merged with Huzurabad constituency. He later contested the 2010 by-polls for Huzurabad constituency and lost to Etela Rajender of TRS by a majority of 79,227 votes.

== Death ==
Muddasani died on 9 April 2012 at Nizam's Institute of Medical Sciences, Hyderabad.
