= Dharmasagar, India =

Dharmasagar
- Town
- Nickname: Dharmasagar
- Location in Telangana, India Dharmasagar (India)
- Coordinates: 17°59′36″N 79°26′34″E
- Country: India
- State: Telangana
- District: Hanamkonda district

Population
  - Total: 69,043

Languages
  - Official: Telugu
- Time zone: UTC+5:30 (IST)
- PIN: 506142
- Vehicle registration: TS 03
- Lok Sabha constituency: Warangal
- Vidhan Sabha constituency: Station Ghanpur
- Website: telangana.gov.in

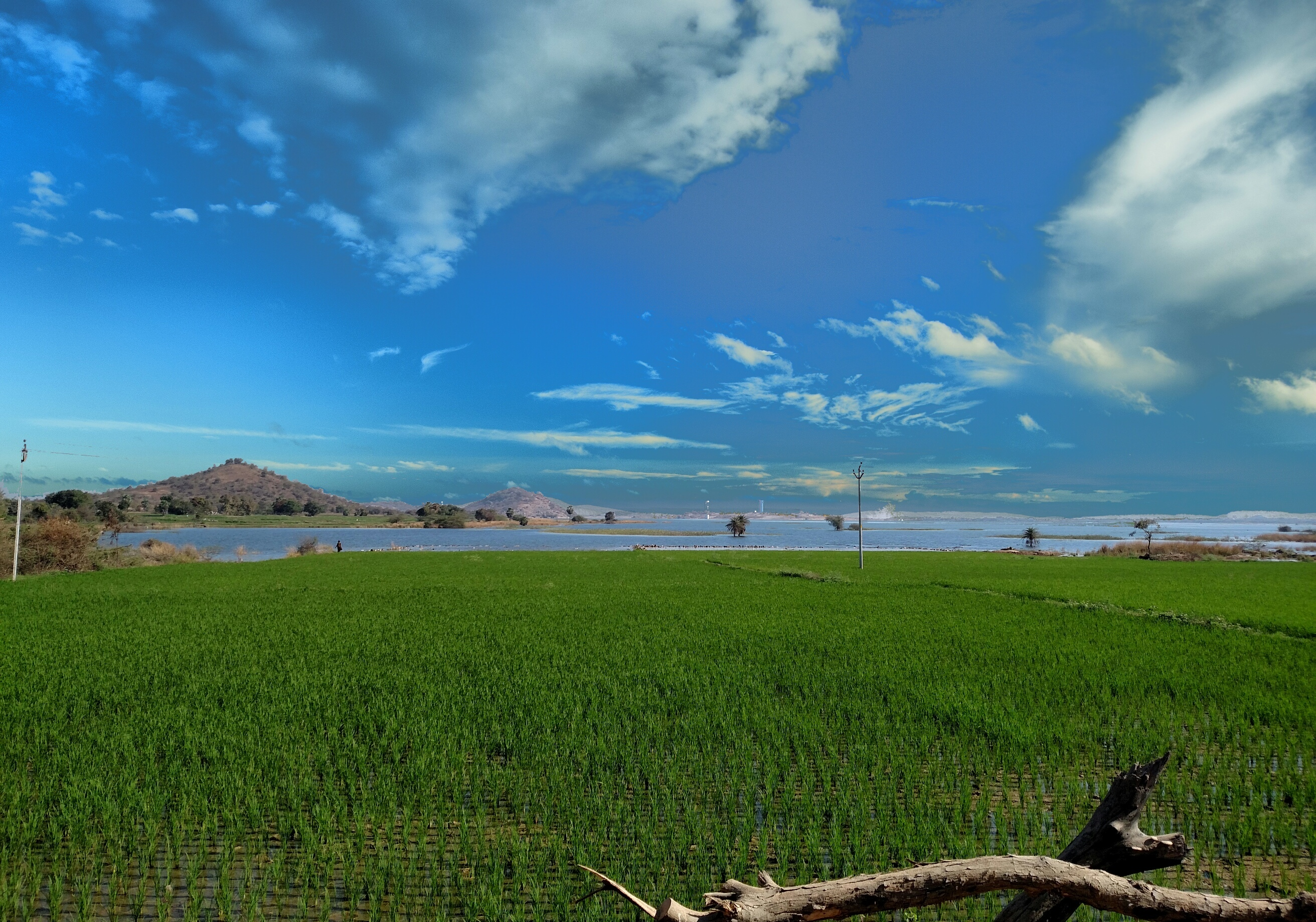

Dharmasagar is a Town and a mandal in Hanamkonda district in Telangana, India. Dharmasagar is well connected with towns like Kazipet, and Hanamakonda by road. It is 14.4 km far from its District Main Town Warangal and 122 km far from its State Capital Hyderabad.

Dharmasagar village and Mandal is bounded by Hanamkonda Mandal towards East, Hasanparthy Mandal towards East, Elkathurthi Mandal towards North, Warangal Mandal towards East.

== Dolmen ==
There is a megalithic dolmen graves site located in the Dharmasar Hillock near Dharmasagar reservoir.

== Reservoir ==
The lake in Dharmasagar is said to be one of the places where Rama, Lakshmana, and Sita from the Ramayana stayed when they were in exile.

Dharmasagar lake has been the prime source of potable water and one of the three summer storage tanks to Warangal for the last 30 years.

The drinking water problem of Warangal has been solved as its principal source, Dharmasagar lake has been remodeled from lake into a balancing reservoir of Devadula project to hold 1.5 tmcft of water to cater to the needs of the people of Warangal and to irrigate 50,000 acres of land in the surrounding villages.

== Connectivity ==
Nearby villages of this village by distance are Devunoor(5.2 km), Madikonda(5.4 km), Madipalle(6.1 km), Mupparam(6.2 km), Somadevarapalle(6.2 km). Nearest towns are Dharmasagar(0 km), Hanamkonda(8.6 km), Hasanparthy (12.5 km), Ghanpur (Station)(14.3 km).

Pindlai Rail Way Station, Kazipet Jn Rail Way Station are the very nearby railway stations to Dharmasagar Mandal.

== Educational Institutions & Industries ==
- S.R Concept School, Unikicherla
- ST.Antony's High School
- GOVT Junior College
- Sri Kakatiya Inst. of Pharmacy
- Chaitanya Inst. of Pharm. Science

As it is near to major towns, there was always been considerable boom in industrial fields and most seen industries are (raw & parboiled) rice mills. Some of them are

- Satya Sai Veera Bhadra Binny Rice Mill(S.S.V.B.B.R.M)
- Satya Narayana Rice Mill
- Hanuman Industries
- Surya Industries

== Demographics ==
Total population of Dharmasagar Mandal is 69,043 living in 15,071 Houses, Spread across total 49 villages and 24 panchayats . Males are 34,976 and Females are 34,067. It has total 2237 families residing. The Dharmasagar village has population of 9350 of which 4667 are males while 4683 are females as per Population Census 2011.In Dharmasagar village population of children with age 0-6 is 813 which makes up 8.70% of total population of village. Average Sex Ratio of Dharmasagar village is 1003 which is higher than Andhra Pradesh state average of 993. Child Sex Ratio for the Dharmasagar as per census is 856, lower than Andhra Pradesh average of 939.Dharmasagar village has higher literacy rate compared to Andhra Pradesh. In 2011, literacy rate of Dharmasagar village was 69.54% compared to 67.02% of Andhra Pradesh. In Dharmasagar Male literacy stands at 78.10% while female literacy rate was 61.14%.

Villages	Population
Devunoor	2,563
Dharmapur	2,418
Dharmasagar	9,350
Elkurthi	4,779
Gundlasagar	1,216
Janakipur	1,460
Kyathampalle	1,548
Malakpalle	3,449
Mallikudurla	2,442
Mupparam	3,223
Narayanagiri	4,494
Peddapendyala	7,152
Peechera	5,306
Rampur	5,277
Sodeshapalle	1,347
Somadevarapalle	1,468
Thatikayala	3,486
Velair	9,662

== Tragic Incidents ==
Dharmasagar used to be a tourist attraction for people living in neighborhood who are looking to spend weekend with their friends and families. It has also attracted many Trekkers from different locations who crave for an adventure. But since the day the lake has been made into a reservoir for Devadula Project, which draws huge amounts of water from River Godavari, it has become a hazardous zone for picnics and trekking. There are reports of around 17 accidental deaths in past 3 years of people who visited this place who were drowned or flushed away by the huge water currents due to intake of large volumes of water from Godavari river. It also made into news when 5 engineering students were drowned recently.

This zone is marked as a 'Hazardous Spot' and people were forbidden from swimming in the lake. The police have clearly stated that this is no longer a tourist spot and its sole purpose is to cater the drinking water needs of people of tri-cities and also serve as an aid to agriculture. There are reports of this lake being made into a Tourist destination in future once all the construction works related to Project Devadula and Mission Bhagiratha are completed.
