= Pamulaparthi Sadasiva Rao =

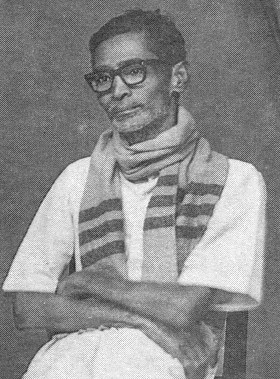
- Born: 21 July 1921
- Died: 1996 (aged 75)
- Occupations: Poet, Journalist, Political thinker

Pamulaparthi Sadasiva Rao (17 July 1921 – 26 August 1996) was a thinker, philosopher, and free lance journalist. He started the monthly magazine Kakatiya Patrika in 1944 in Warangal, India, in 1948 with his cousin P. V. Narasimha Rao, later Prime Minister of India.

== Early life ==
Sadasiva Rao was born in Warangal to Durgabai and Hanumantha Rao. He was educated at the then Collegiate High School, Hanamkonda in Warangal district of the then Hyderabad State.

=== Literary career ===
Among his Telugu writings were GatiTarkika Bhotika Vadam (on dialectic materialism), Charitra, Sanskriti, Kala (history, tradition, culture and art), and Tatva Shastra Praadhamika Paathalu (fundamentals of philosophy).

He translated Theory of Knowledge, an English language book by Maurice Cornforth, into the Telugu Gyana Siddhantam, published by the Visalandhra Publishing House.

=== Death ===
He died of cancer on 26 August 1996.

== Commemoration ==
There is a memorial trust and an annual Pamulaparthi Sadasiva Rao endowment lecture at Kakatiya University.
