= Etela Rajender =

Indian politician

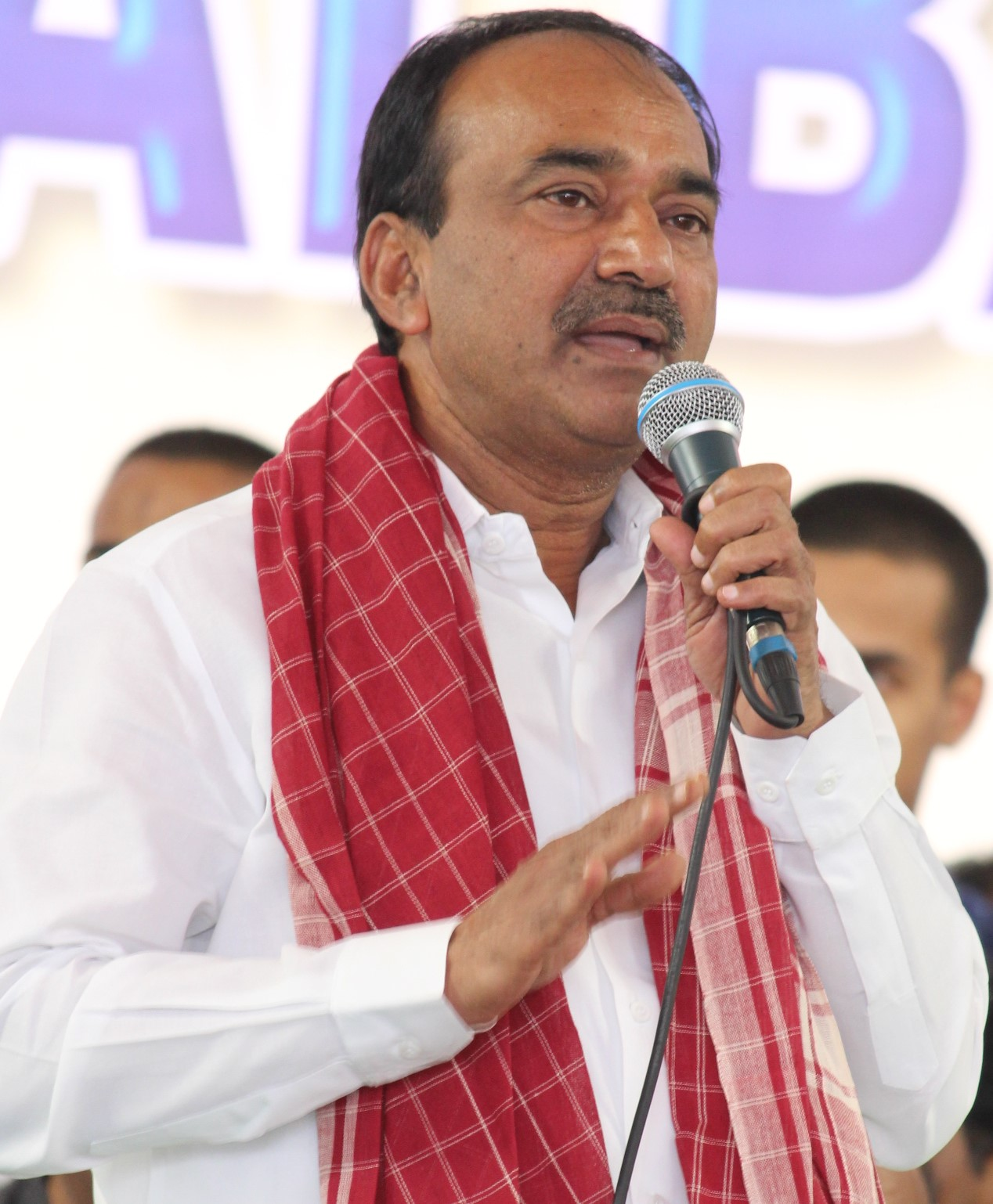
- Rajender in 2023

Member of Parliament, Lok Sabha
- Incumbent
- Assumed office 4 June 2024
- Preceded by: Revanth Reddy
- Constituency: Malkajgiri

Minister of Health, Medical and Family Welfare Government of Telangana
- In office 12 February 2019 – 1 May 2021
- Governor: E. S. L. Narasimhan; Tamilisai Soundararajan
- Chief Minister: K. Chandrashekar Rao
- Preceded by: C. Laxma Reddy
- Succeeded by: T. Harish Rao

Minister of Finance & Planning, Small Savings, State Lotteries, Consumer Affairs, Legal Meteorology and Civil Supplies Government of Telangana
- In office 2 June 2014 – 12 December 2018
- Governor: E. S. L. Narasimhan
- Chief Minister: K. Chandrashekar Rao
- Preceded by: Office established
- Succeeded by: T. Harish Rao

Member of Legislative Assembly, Telangana
- In office 2 June 2014 – 7 December 2023
- Preceded by: Telangana Assembly created
- Succeeded by: Kaushik Reddy
- Constituency: Huzurabad

Member of Legislative Assembly, Andhra Pradesh
- In office 16 May 2009 – 16 May 2014
- Preceded by: Constituency established
- Succeeded by: Telangana Assembly created
- Constituency: Huzurabad
- In office 11 May 2004 – 16 May 2009
- Preceded by: Muddasani Damodar Reddy
- Succeeded by: Constituency dissolved
- Constituency: Kamalapur

Personal details
- Born: 20 March 1964 (age 62) Kamalapur, Andhra Pradesh (now in Telangana), India
- Party: Bharatiya Janata Party (since 2021)
- Other political affiliations: Bharat Rashtra Samithi (2003–2021)
- Spouse: Jamuna
- Children: 2
- Education: Osmania University (B.Sc)

Etela Rajender (born 20 March 1964) is an Indian politician from Telangana serving as the Member of Parliament from Malkajgiri Lok Sabha constituency. He previously served as the first Finance Minister of Telangana from 2014 to 2018 and as the Health Minister of Telangana from 2019 to 2021. He is a member of Bharatiya Janata Party since 2021.

Rajender represented Kamalapur Assembly constituency from 2004 to 2010 and Huzurabad Assembly constituency from 2010 to 2023 in the Andhra Pradesh Legislative Assembly and Telangana Legislative Assembly. He was a member of the Telangana Rashtra Samithi (TRS) party until 2021, when he joined Bharatiya Janata Party (BJP).

== Political career ==
Rajender joined TRS in 2003. He is recognised as a student leader with a left-wing ideology.

He was elected as the Member of the Legislative Assembly (MLA) from Kamalapur Assembly constituency in the 2004 Andhra Pradesh Legislative Assembly election. He defeated the incumbent MLA Muddasani Damodar Reddy. He served as the TRS floor leader in the Andhra Pradesh Legislative Assembly. He resigned as the MLA in 2008 and was re-elected as an MLA from the same constituency in the 2008 by-election.

In 2009, the Kamalapur constituency was merged with Huzurabad Assembly constituency. He contested the 2009 Andhra Pradesh Legislative Assembly election from Huzurabad constituency and won. In 2010 he resigned as the MLA and won the by-election.

When Telangana state was established in 2014, he was appointed the Finance Minister of Telangana in the first K. Chandrashekar Rao ministry, and served until 2018.

He contested the 2018 Telangana Legislative Assembly election and was re-elected as the MLA from Huzurabad constituency. In 2019, he took oath as the Minister of Health for Telangana. As part of the 2018 election's declaration of assets by contestants, he has furnished ₹42.41 crore (equivalent to ₹62 crore or US$6.6 million in 2026) in assets and was the richest among other ministers.

In May 2021, Rajender, along with his followers and Jamuna Hatcheries, faced allegations of land encroachments in Achampet and Hakimpet villages in Medak district. His ministerial portfolio was removed and he was subsequently dismissed from the state cabinet. Subsequently, on 4 June, he resigned from TRS. On 12 June, he resigned as MLA.

On 14 June 2021, Rajender joined the BJP in the presence of BJP leaders Dharmendra Pradhan and G. Kishan Reddy. He has also resigned as the president of Nampally Exhibition Society, which he held since 2014. He contested the by-election held later that year and won as the MLA.

In 2023 assembly elections, he contested from Huzurabad and Gazwel as BJP candidate and lost in both places to BRS candidates. In 2024 Loksabha elections he contested from Malkajgiri and won as MP with a huge margin of 3,91,475 votes against Congress's Patnam Sunitha Mahender Reddy.

Etela Rajender topped with raising 80 questions as Lok Sabha member from Telangana in participating in debates during the Parliament sessions between 24 June 2024 to 4 April 2025.

== Electoral History ==
=== Legislative Assembly ===
Year	Constituency	Party	Votes	%	Opponent	Party	Votes	%	Result	Margin	%
2023	Gajwel	BJP	66,653	28.68	K. Chandrashekar Rao	BRS	1,11,648	48.05	Lost	-44,995	-19.37
2023	Huzurabad	BJP	63,460	30.32	Padi Kaushik Reddy	BRS	80,333	38.38	Lost	-16,873	-8.06
2021 (Note: By-Election)	Huzurabad	BJP	1,07,022	51.96	Gellu Srinivas Yadav	TRS	83,167	40.38	Won	+23,855	+11.58
2018	Huzurabad	TRS	1,04,840	59.34	Padi Kaushik Reddy	INC	61,121	34.60	Won	+43,719	+24.74
2014	Huzurabad	TRS	95,315	58.76	Kethiri Sudarshan Reddy	INC	38,278	23.60	Won	+57,037	+35.16
2010 (Note: By-Election)	Huzurabad	TRS	93,026	67.36	Muddasani Damodar Reddy	TDP	13,799	9.99	Won	+79,227	+57.37
2009	Huzurabad	TRS	56,752	38.82	V. Krishna Mohan Rao	INC	41,717	28.54	Won	+15,035	+10.28
2008 (Note: By-Election)	Kamalapur	TRS	54,092	44.54	Muddasani Damodar Reddy	TDP	31,808	26.19	Won	+22,284	+18.35
2004	Kamalapur	TRS	68,393	52.44	Muddasani Damodar Reddy	TDP	48,774	37.40	Won	+19,619	+15.04

=== Lok Sabha ===
Year	Constituency	Party	Votes	%	Opponent	Party	Votes	%	Result	Margin	%
2024	Malkajgiri	BJP	9,91,042	51.25	P. Sunitha Mahender Reddy	INC	5,99,587	31.00	Won	+3,91,455	+20.25

== Personal life ==
Etela was born on 20 March 1964 into a Mudiraju family in Kamalapur, Hanumakonda district of present-day Telangana. His father, Sri Mallaiah (or Pedda Mallaiah), was a respected figure who passed away in August 2022. He has studied B.Sc. from Osmania University in 1984. He married Jamuna, who owns Jamuna Hatcheries. They have two children, Nithin Rajender (son) and Neeta Rajender (daughter) .
