= Hanamkonda district =

Coordinates: 17.95°N 79.5°E

Hanumakonda district
- District of Telangana
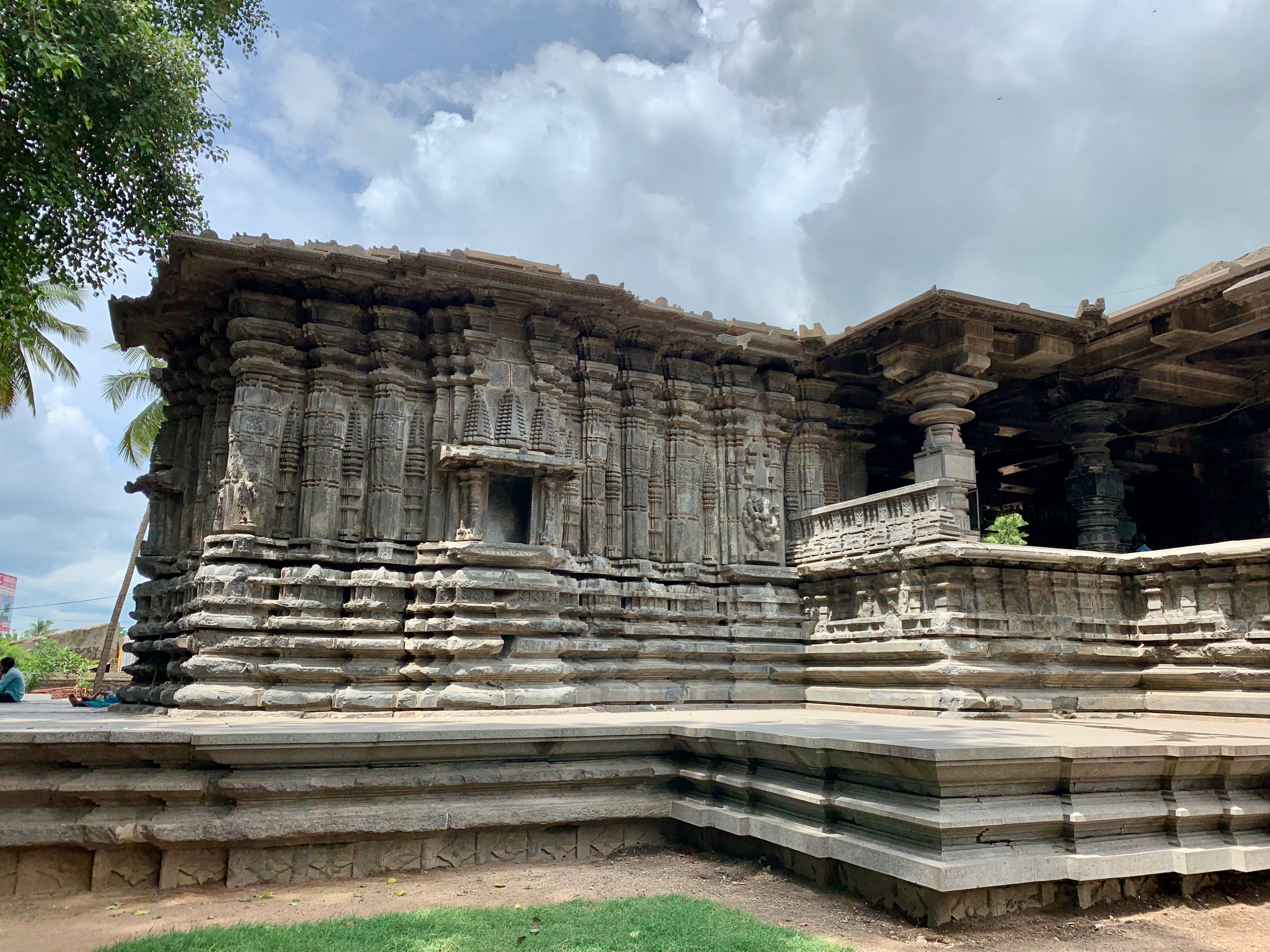
- Thousand Pillar Temple in Hanumakonda
- Interactive map of Hanumakonda district
- Country: India
- State: Telangana
- Headquarters: Hanumakonda
- Mandalas: 14

Government
  - District collector: Chahat Bajpai IAS
  - Assembly constituencies: 3

Area
  - Total: 1,309 km^{2} (505 sq mi)

Population (2011)
  - Total: 1,080,858
  - Density: 825.7/km^{2} (2,139/sq mi)
  - Urban: 740,507
- Time zone: UTC+05:30 (IST)
- Vehicle registration: TG–03
- Website: hanumakonda.telangana.gov.in

Hanumakonda district is a district in the Indian state of Telangana. The district headquarters are located at Hanumakonda. The district borders the districts of Jangaon, Karimnagar, Warangal, Bhupalpally and Siddipet.

The district was formed in 2016 by carving out Warangal Urban district from the erstwhile Warangal district. In August 2021, the Warangal Urban district was renamed as Hanumakonda district.

== History ==
=== Formation of District ===
During the rule of Nizam of Hyderabad, State of Hyderabad was divided into many small Circars. Warangal became a Circar in the early 1800s.

In 1866 Circars was Abolished and merged to create districts, Warangal district was created by merging Warangal, Khummettu and part of Bhonagheer circars. Jangaon area from Bhongir Circar was transferred to warangal and Kamalapur area of warangal transferred to Karimnagar district. In 1905 when Princely state of Hyderabad sub divided into Four Division namely 1.Aurangabad Division, 2.Gulbarga Division, 3.Gulshanabad Division, 4.Warangal Division. During formation divisions again districts were delimited in 1905 Jangaon(Cherial) Taluka and Kodar(Kodad) Sub Taluka transferred to Nalgonda District from Warangal district. In 1905 AD, Warangal district was formed with Warangal, Parkala, Khammam, Yellandu, Mahabubabad, Madhira, Palvancha taluks and some area of old palvancha sanstan and some jagirs. This was bigger than many districts of Hyderabad state.

Warangal district was divided to facilitate administrative control and on October 1, 1953, the Khamman district was formed. Khammam, Yellandu, Madhira, Burugunpahad and Palavancha talukas have been made part of it. Warangal, Mulugu, Mahaboobabad, Parkala remained in Warangal district. But Parkala from Karimnagar and Jangaon from Nalgonda have become part of Warangal district. District uses to consist of 6 talukas and 2 revenue divisions which later increased to 15 talukas in 1979. In 1985 when N. T. Rama Rao introduces mandal system in warangal district was divided in to 50 mandals, but again warangal mandal was curved out from Hanumakonda madal consisting only urban area of warangal which increased to total 51 mandals and revenue divisions increased to 5 in warangal district.

== Geography ==
Hanumakonda district occupies an area of 1,309 square kilometres (505 sq mi).

== Demographics ==
Religion in Hanumakonda district (2011)
Hinduism	87.68%
Islam	10.50%
Christianity	1.38%
Other or not stated	0.44%

As of 2011 Census of India, Hanumakonda district has a population of 1,080,858. Hanumakonda has a sex ratio of 997 females per 1000 males and a literacy rate of 76.17%. 100,918 (9.33%) were under 6 years of age. 740,507 (68.51%) lived in urban areas. Scheduled Castes and Scheduled Tribes made up 196,046 (18.14%) and 33,306 (3.08%) of the population respectively.

Languages of Hanumakonda district (2011)
1. Telugu (86.1%)
2. Urdu (9.96%)
3. Lambadi (1.97%)
4. Hindi (0.93%)
5. Others (1.08%)

At the time of the 2011 census, 86.06% of the population spoke Telugu, 9.96% Urdu, 1.97% Lambadi and 0.93% Hindi as their first language.

== Administrative divisions ==
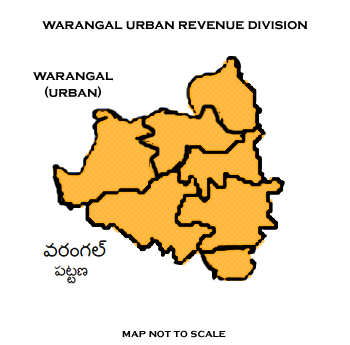
Warangal (urban) District Revenue division

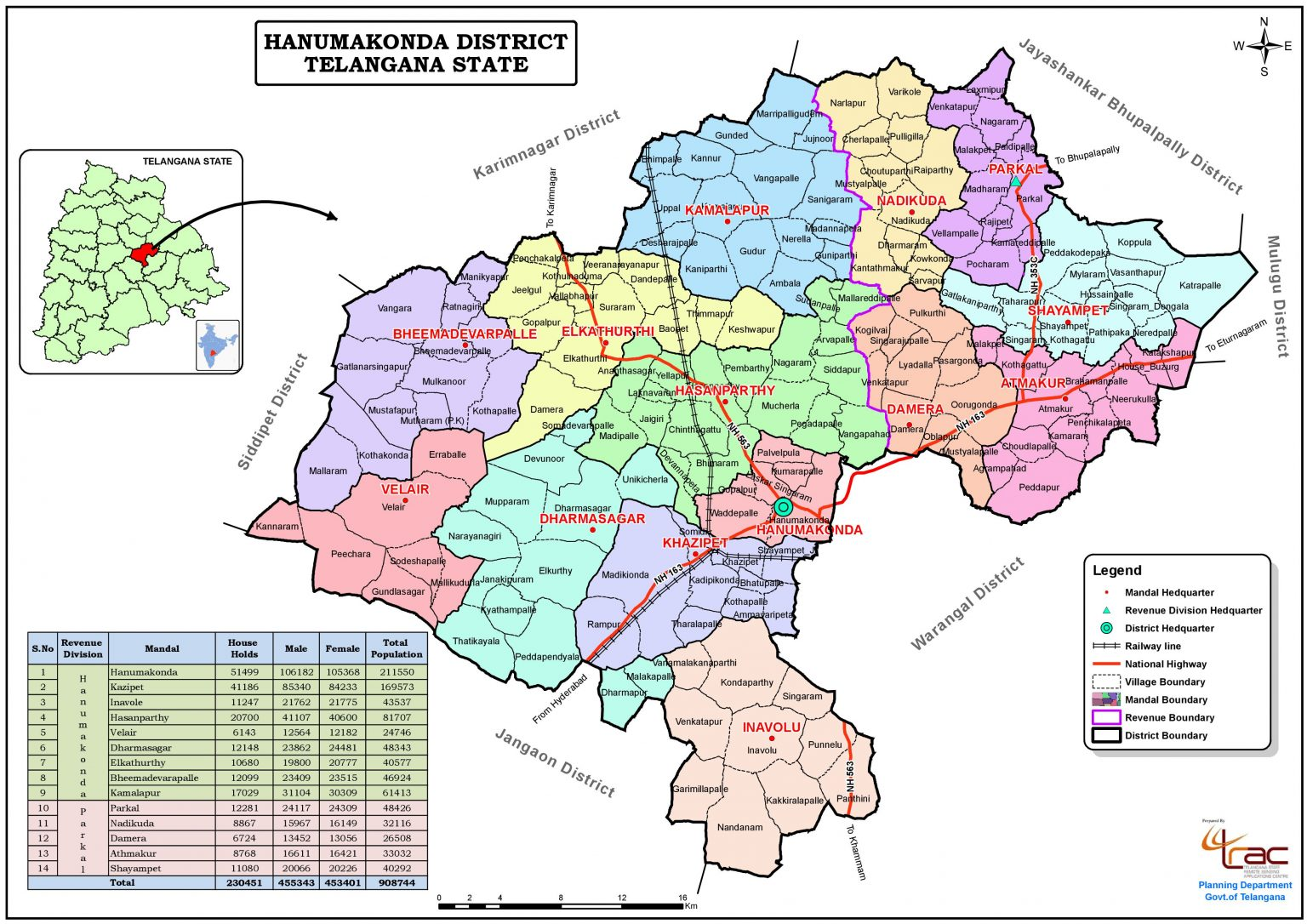
Hanumakonda District Map By TG Planning Commission

The district has two revenue divisions i.e., Hanumakonda and Parkal and is sub-divided into 14 mandals. Sneha Shabarish is the present collector of the district.

=== Mandals ===
Hanumakonda Revenue Division:

1. Hanumakonda
2. Kazipet
3. Kamalapur
4. Hasanparthy
5. Inavolu
6. Velair
7. Dharmasagar
8. Elkathurthy
9. Bheemadevarpalle

Parkal Revenue Division:

1. Parkal
2. Nadikuda
3. Damera
4. Athmakur
5. Shayampet

== Economy ==
In 2006 the Indian government named Warangal one of the country's 250 most backward districts (out of a total of 640). It is one of the thirteen districts in Andhra Pradesh currently receiving funds from the Backward Regions Grant Fund Programme (BRGF).

== Culture ==
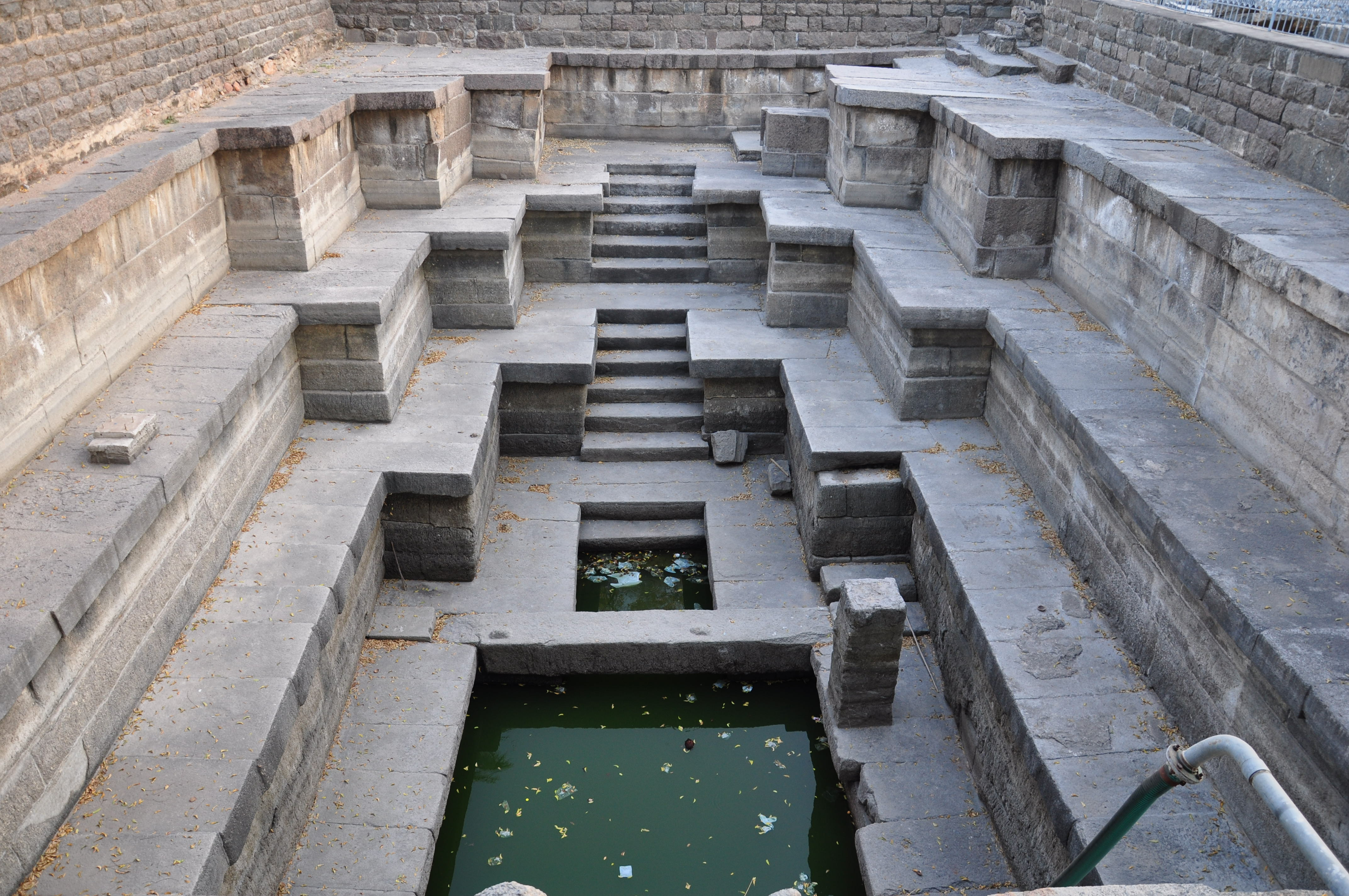
Thousand Pillar Temple pond

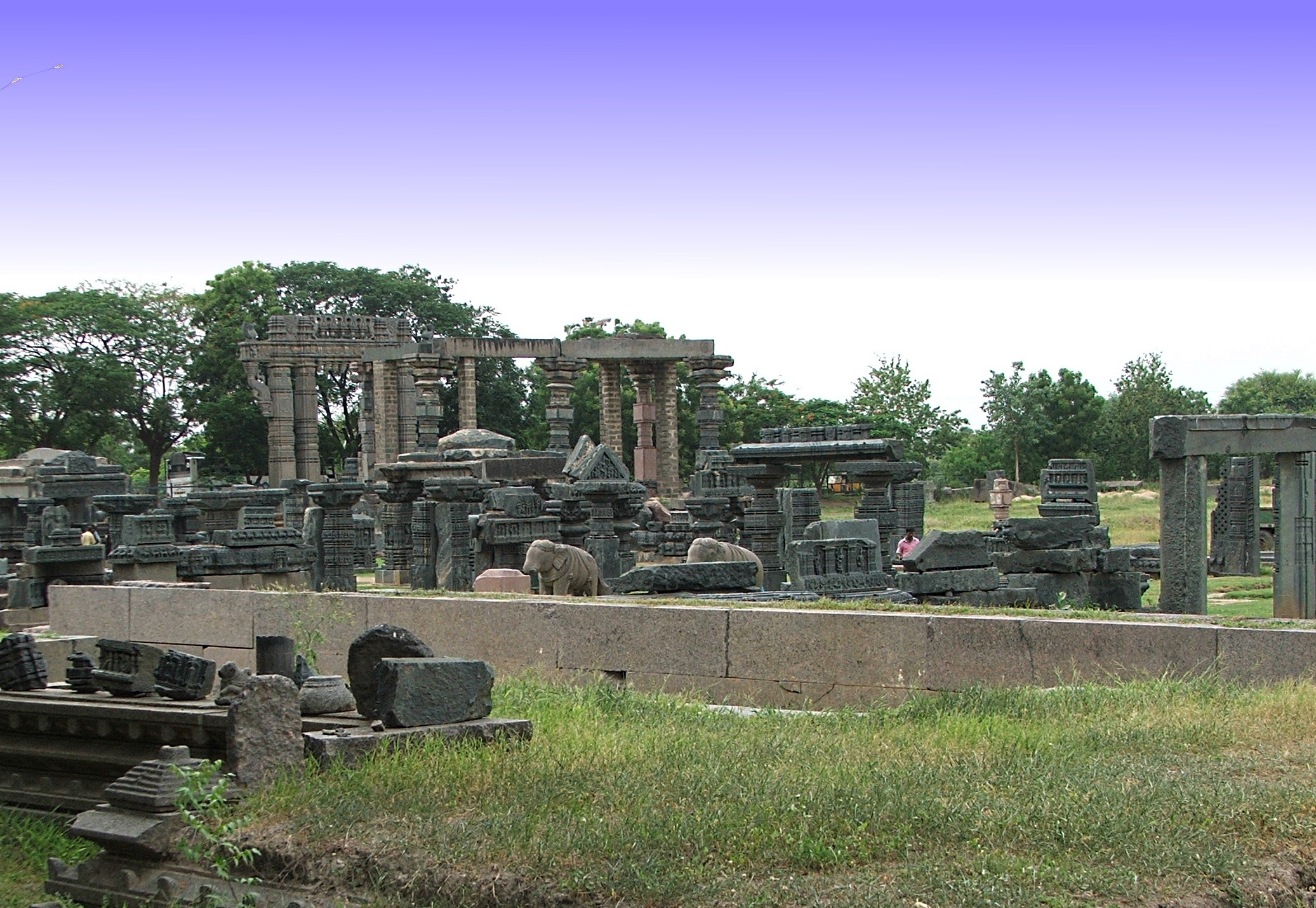
Warangal Fort Ruins

In February 2013, Warangal was accorded World Heritage city status by UNESCO. A few tourist attractions include:

- Warangal Fort
- Thousand Pillar Temple
- Padmakshi Temple
- Bhadrakali Temple

A few of the notable personalities from the district include, Rudrama Devi, Kaloji Narayana Rao, Kothapalli Jayashankar, Nerella Venumadhav, and P. V. Narasimha Rao.

== Transport ==
National Highway 163 (India) between Hyderabad – Bhopalpatnam of Chhattisgarh, National Highway 563 (India) between Jagitial-Khammam passes through the district. Warangal has three railway stations kazipet town railway station, Kazipet Railway Station and Warangal Railway Station, which connects South and North India. The district has a small airport in Mamnoor, which can accommodate small aircraft like the ATR 42. This airport is currently used by police for gliding sorties, skeet shooting and aero-modeling.

== Education ==
Major educational institutions include, National Institute of Technology Warangal, Kakatiya Medical College, Kakatiya University, Kaloji Narayana Rao University of Health Sciences, University Arts and Science College, Kakatiya Institute of Technology and Science.

== See also ==
- List of districts in Telangana
