= Huzurabad =

- Town

- Location in Telangana, India Huzurabad (India)
- Coordinates: 18°12′7.059″N 79°23′46.825″E
- Country: India
- State: Telangana
- District: Karimnagar

Government
  - Body: Municipal council
  - MLA: Kaushik Reddy
  - MP: Bandi Sanjay Kumar (BJP)

Area
  - Total: 32.24 km^{2} (12.45 sq mi)
- Elevation: 271 m (889 ft)

Population (2011)
  - Total: 37,656
  - Density: 1,168/km^{2} (3,025/sq mi)

Languages
  - Official: Telugu, Urdu
- Time zone: UTC+5:30 (IST)
- PIN: 505468
- Telephone code: 91-8727
- Vehicle registration: TG-02
- Lok Sabha: Karimnagar
- Assembly constituency: Huzurabad
- Website: www.manahuzurabad.com

Huzurabad is a town in the Huzurabad mandal of Karimnagar district in the Indian state of Telangana. It is a municipality in the district. It is located about 41 kilometres (25 mi) from Karimnagar and 38 kilometres (24 mi) from Warangal.

== Geography ==
Huzurabad is at 18.20°N 79.42°E. It has an average elevation of 271 metres (889 ft).

== Demographics ==
In the 2011 census, Huzurabad had a population of 37,665 (19,208 males and 18,457 females — a sex ratio of 961 females per 1000 males). 3,140 children were in the age group of 0–6 years. The average literacy rate was 75.72% with 26,141 literates.

== Government and politics ==
Huzurabad Nagar Panchayat was constituted in 2011 and has 20 election wards. The jurisdiction of the civic body is spread over an area of 32.24 km^{2} (12.45 mi^{2}). In 2019, it became a municipality.

== Transport ==
Huzurabad is well connected by road. National Highway 563 passes through this town. State run TSRTC buses operates from Huzurabad bus depot to various cities and towns of the state and to surrounding rural areas.

=== Rail ===
Huzurabad will be part of the proposed Karimnagar-Hasanparthy line. The line was sanctioned for final location survey in September 2023 by the South Central Railways.

== Notable people ==
The former prime minister, P. V. Narasimha Rao, studied here in the Government Boys' High School.
