= Hasanparthy mandal =

Hasanparthy
- Town
- Location in Telangana, India Hasanparthy (India)
- Coordinates: 18.068056°N 79.523611°E
- Country: India
- State: Telangana

Government
  - Body: Greater Warangal Municipal Corporation

Population
  - Total: 30,000

Languages
  - Official: Telugu
- Time zone: UTC+5:30 (IST)
- PIN: 506371
- Vehicle registration: TS
- Website: telangana.gov.in

Hasanparthy is a mandal in Hanumakonda district in the state of Telangana in India. It is governed by Greater Warangal Municipal Corporation.

== Transport ==
=== Roadway ===
Hasanparthy is very well connected with road. NH 563 passes through the area, that connects the city of Warangal.

=== Railway ===
Hasanparthy has a railway station – Hasanparthy Road, that is preceding the Kazipet Junction on Nagpur–Hyderabad line.
