= Damera =

- Mandal
- Location in Telangana, India Damera (India)
- Coordinates: 17°52′55″N 79°52′10″E
- Country: India
- State: Telangana
- District: Hanamkonda district
- Talukas: Damera Telugu: దామెర

Languages
  - Official: Telugu
- Time zone: UTC+5:30 (IST)
- Postal code: 506006
- Vehicle registration: TS
- Website: telangana.gov.in

Damera is a village and a mandal in Hanamkonda district in the state of Telangana in India.

- List of Villages in Damera mandal

1. Oorugonda

2. Oblapur

3. Kantathmakur

4. Kogilvai

5. Kauvkonda

6. Damera

7. Pasargonda

8. Pulkurthi

9. Mustyalpalle

10. Ladalla

11. Venkatapur

12. Sarvapur

13. Singarajupalle.
