= Thousand Pillar Temple =

12th century Hindu temple in Warangal, Telangana

- వెయ్యి స్తంభాల గుడి
- Thousand Pillar temple

- Location in Telangana State Thousand Pillar Temple (India)

Religion
- Affiliation: Hinduism
- Deity: Shiva, Vishnu, Surya
- Governing body: Central government and state government

Location
- Location: Hanamakonda, India
- State: Telangana
- Country: India
- Coordinates: 18°00′13.4″N 79°34′29.1″E

Architecture
- Type: Kakatiya, Chalukya, Kadamba architecture/Vesara
- Creator: Rudra Deva
- Completed: 1163; 863 years ago CE

The Thousand Pillar Temple or Rudreswara Swamy Temple is a historical Hindu temple located in the city of Hanamakonda, Telangana, India. It is dedicated to Shiva, Vishnu and Surya. The Thousand Pillar Temple, along with the Warangal Fort and the Kakatiya Kala Thoranam were added to the tentative list of UNESCO World Heritage sites.

== History ==
Many Hindu temples were developed under the patronage of Kakatiya rulers Ganapati Deva, Rudrama Devi and Prataparudra. The Thousand Pillar Temple was believed to have been constructed between 1175 and 1324 CE by the order of the Kakatiya king Rudra Deva. Dedicated primarily to Shiva, the temple is also known by the name of Sri Rudreshwara Swamy Temple.

It was desecrated by the Tughlaq dynasty during their invasion of the Deccan.

However, the 7th Nizam of Hyderabad, Mir Osman Ali Khan, donated a grant of 1 Lakh INR towards the reconstruction of this temple.

Panatula Venugopal being an executive officer of the temple, has brought many changes to the administration style and development of the temple.

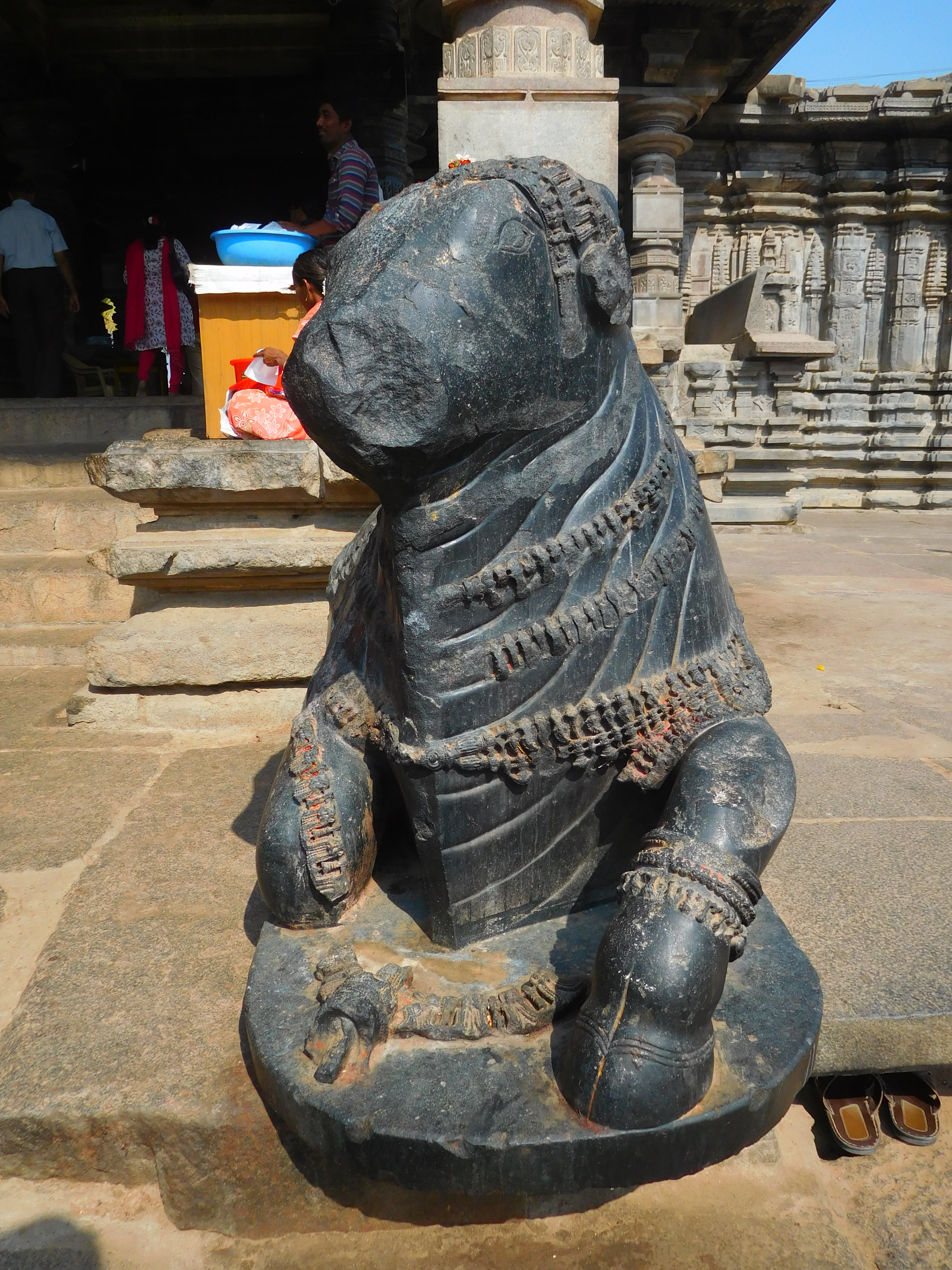
Sculpture of Nandi at Thousand Pillar Temple

At this temple, three Hindu deities Shiva, Vishnu, and Surya are worshipped. They are known collectively as the Trikutalayam.

== Architecture ==
The Thousand Pillar Temple with its ruins lies near the Hanamkonda-Warangal Highway in Telangana, about 150 kilometres (93 mi) from the city of Hyderabad.

Rudreswara Temple locally known in Telugu as the Veyyi Stambhāla Guḍi (Telugu: వెయ్యి స్తంభాల గుడి; lit. "thousand pillar temple"). It is one of the earliest available examples of Kakatiya art, architecture and sculpture. It was built in the style of later Chalukyan and early Kakatiyan Architecture, star-shaped and triple shrined (Trikutalaya). The temple has one thousand pillars. There are richly carved pillars, perforated screens, exquisite icons, rock cut elephants and the monolithic dolerite Nandi as components of the temple. Strengthening of foundations like sandbox technique, the skill of Kakatiya sculptors is manifest in adroit craftsmanship and flawless ivory carving technique in their art. The ingenuity of Kakatiya sculptors is visible in likes of lathe turned, and shiny polish in dolerite and granite stone sculpture and craftwork of Nava Rangamandapa.

The temple was renovated in 2004 by the Government of India. Archaeological Survey of India and modern engineers have been working for the temple's further renovation.

== Transport ==
The nearest railway station is Warangal railway station, which is 6 kilometres (3.7 miles) away from the temple. Rajiv Gandhi International Airport is the nearest airport to this temple.
