= Kamalapur, Hanamkonda district =

Kamalapur
- town
- Location in Telangana, India Kamalapur (India)
- Coordinates: 18°09′36″N 79°32′26″E
- Country: India
- State: Telangana
- District: Hanumakonda district
- Talukas: Kamalapur

Government
  - Body: mandal

Area
  - Total: 13.16 km^{2} (5.08 sq mi)

Population (2011)
  - Total: 10,423
  - Density: 792/km^{2} (2,050/sq mi)
- Demonym: Kamalapuri

Languages
  - Official: Telugu, Hindi, Urdu
- Time zone: UTC+5:30 (IST)
- PIN: 505102
- Website: telangana.gov.in

Kamalapur or Kamalapuram is a mandal of Hanumakonda district in the Indian state of Telangana. It is located near Warangal and Kakatiyas. It is close to Kakatiya University.

The first finance minister of Telangana, Shri Etela Rajender, studied in Kamalapur in the Govt Boys High school. Kamalapur is an educational hub and Government Hospital services for nearby towns and villages.

== Economy ==
Kamalapur is mainly an agricultural town. The main products are rice and cotton.

== Geography ==
Kamalpur is 25km from Hanumakonda district headquarters.

Kamalapur lake is the town's largest.

== Transport ==
=== Road ===
Mancherial, Jammikunta, Huzurabad, and Parkal buses pass through the area. Roads connect Karimnagar district with Mulugu and Bhupalpally districts.

=== Railway ===
Uppal railway station provides access to Kazipet Junction on Nagpur–Hyderabad rail line.
