= Hanamkonda =

Hanumakonda
- Tri-City
- Hanumakonda
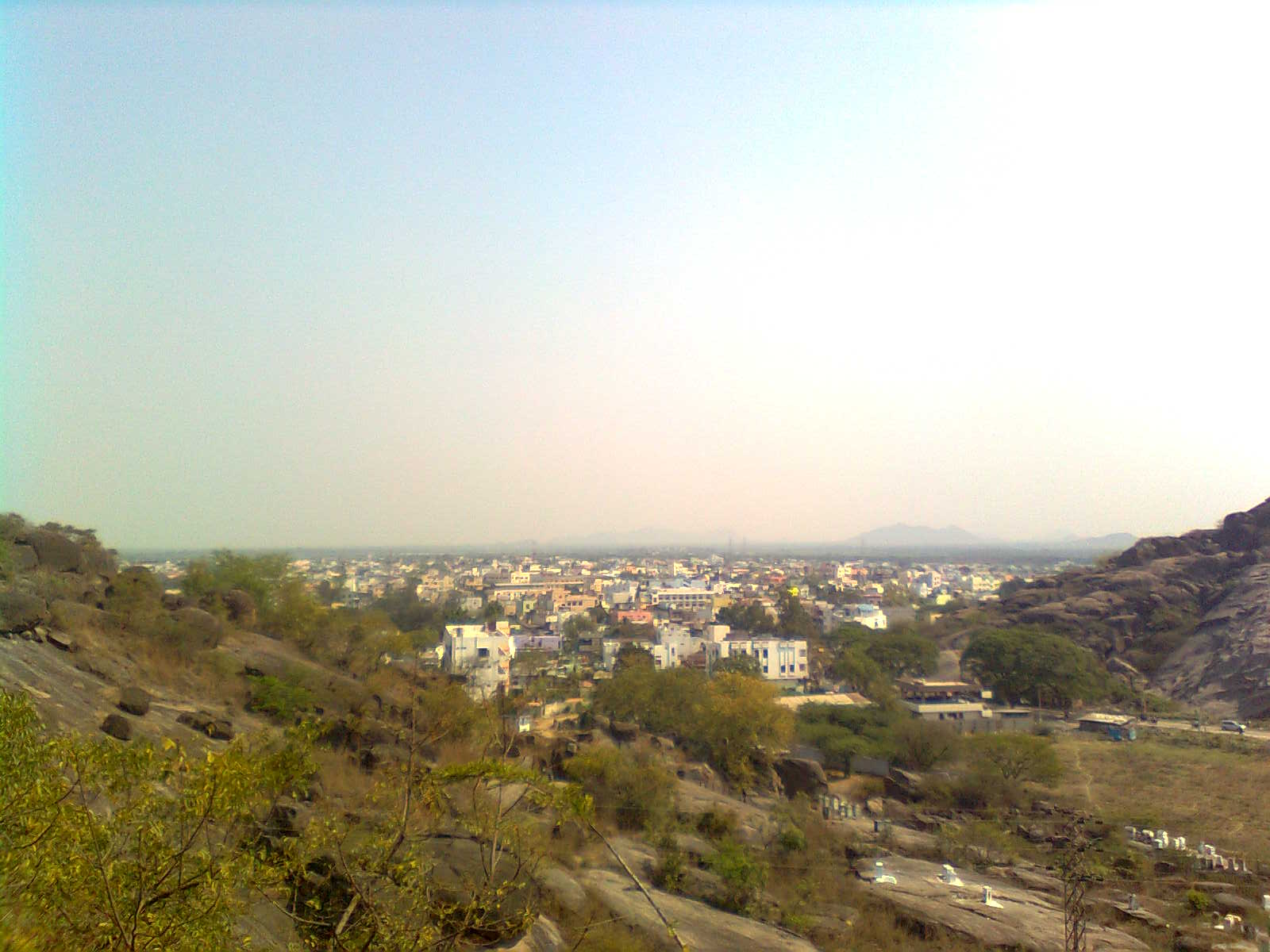
- Hanamakonda skyline

- Location in Telangana, India Hanumakonda (India)
- Coordinates: 18°0′21.815″N 79°32′53.083″E
- Country: India
- State: Telangana
- District: Hanamkonda district
- Body: Municipal corporation
- Founded: 1199
- Founder: Ganapatideva

Government
  - Type: Municipal Corporation

Area
  - Total: 50 km^{2} (19 sq mi)
- Elevation: 1,200 m (3,900 ft)

Languages
  - Official: Telugu
- Time zone: UTC+5:30 (IST)
- PIN Code: 506001
- Telephone code: +91–870
- Vehicle registration: TG–03

Hanamakonda, officially known as Hanumakonda, is a major city and the district headquarters of Hanamkonda district in the Indian state of Telangana. It is about 150 KM away from the state Capital Hyderabad and about 7KM away from former district Head quarters Warangal. It is also one of the tri-city along with Warangal and Kazipet. The historic Thousand Pillar Temple is also located here.

== History ==
The great kings of Kakatiya dynasty left their marks in the state of Telangana for over several centuries. The famous fort of Warangal and the Thousand Pillared Temple. It has come to light that the original capital of Kakatiya Kings was not Warangal; they in fact had shifted the capital to Warangal for reasons unknown. It could probably be strategically ideal for a King to run his empire from the hill fort of Warangal.

Hanumakonda or Anmakonda is a short distance from the north of Warangal, and may be the ancient suburb of Warangal. Hanumakonda was the older capital of the Kakatiya kings before they actually shifted the new capital to Warangal during the reign of Ganapati Deva. The district around it was called Sabbi sayira or Sabbi one thousand which was a part of the empire of Kalyani. The land of Hanumakonda was also referred to as Anmakonda Vishaya. However, the actual Sanskrit name was supposed to be Hanumadachala or the Hill of Hanumat (Hanuman), the famous follower of the hero of Ramayana, Lord Rama. The most breath-taking feature of Anmakonda is the thousand pillar temple built by King Rudra in 1163 CE.

Warangal eventually replaced Anmakonda as the new city during the time of Ganapati Deva. Warangal was actually the corrupted term or the later name for Ekasaila, which means 'one rock.' In the Sanskrit texts the name sees a literal translation of Orugallu as Ekasaila, whose again original form was Ekasailanagara. The Telugu form of the name is Orumgallu. The city was prosperous needless to say.

In the time before Ganapati deva, the city of Warangal occupied a menial position but it was finally king Rudra I who further popularized the city by his work. It was provided with a stone wall by Rudra's nephew and successor Ganapati. The fortifications of the city were finally completed by the daughter and successor Rudramma devi. From the onset of 14th century, the city had to face successive wars under the hands of Tugluq dynasty. Mohammed bin Tugluq took it in 1323 CE and again renamed the place as Sultanpur.

== Climate ==
As Hanumakonda is located in the semi-arid region of Telangana, it has a hot and dry climate. Summer starts in March and continues through mid-June. The monsoon arrives in June and lasts until September. Winter starts in mid-October and lasts until early February.

Climate data for Hanamkonda (1991–2020, extremes 1901–2020)
Month	Jan	Feb	Mar	Apr	May	Jun	Jul	Aug	Sep	Oct	Nov	Dec	Year
Record high °C (°F)	36.1 (97.0)	39.6 (103.3)	42.2 (108.0)	45.1 (113.2)	47.2 (117.0)	47.8 (118.0)	39.6 (103.3)	39.6 (103.3)	38.4 (101.1)	38.6 (101.5)	36.6 (97.9)	35.2 (95.4)	47.8 (118.0)
Mean daily maximum °C (°F)	30.2 (86.4)	32.9 (91.2)	36.4 (97.5)	39.2 (102.6)	41.6 (106.9)	36.5 (97.7)	32.9 (91.2)	31.3 (88.3)	32.6 (90.7)	32.4 (90.3)	31.1 (88.0)	29.9 (85.8)	33.9 (93.0)
Mean daily minimum °C (°F)	16.4 (61.5)	19.3 (66.7)	22.2 (72.0)	24.8 (76.6)	27.2 (81.0)	26.0 (78.8)	24.7 (76.5)	24.2 (75.6)	24.4 (75.9)	23.1 (73.6)	19.3 (66.7)	15.8 (60.4)	22.1 (71.8)
Record low °C (°F)	8.9 (48.0)	10.6 (51.1)	14.4 (57.9)	17.8 (64.0)	17.2 (63.0)	16.3 (61.3)	17.8 (64.0)	16.6 (61.9)	17.6 (63.7)	15.0 (59.0)	9.4 (48.9)	8.3 (46.9)	8.3 (46.9)
Average rainfall mm (inches)	5.8 (0.23)	4.9 (0.19)	4.4 (0.17)	4.6 (0.18)	12.9 (0.51)	100.8 (3.97)	149.6 (5.89)	107.8 (4.24)	50.3 (1.98)	64.1 (2.52)	10.2 (0.40)	3.1 (0.12)	518.5 (20.41)
Average rainy days	0.1	0.3	0.2	0.3	1.1	6.1	7.9	7.9	3.9	3.3	0.9	0.3	32.3
Average relative humidity (%) (at 17:30 IST)	59	57	56	54	50	59	71	75	72	69	66	60	62
Source: India Meteorological Department

== Culture ==
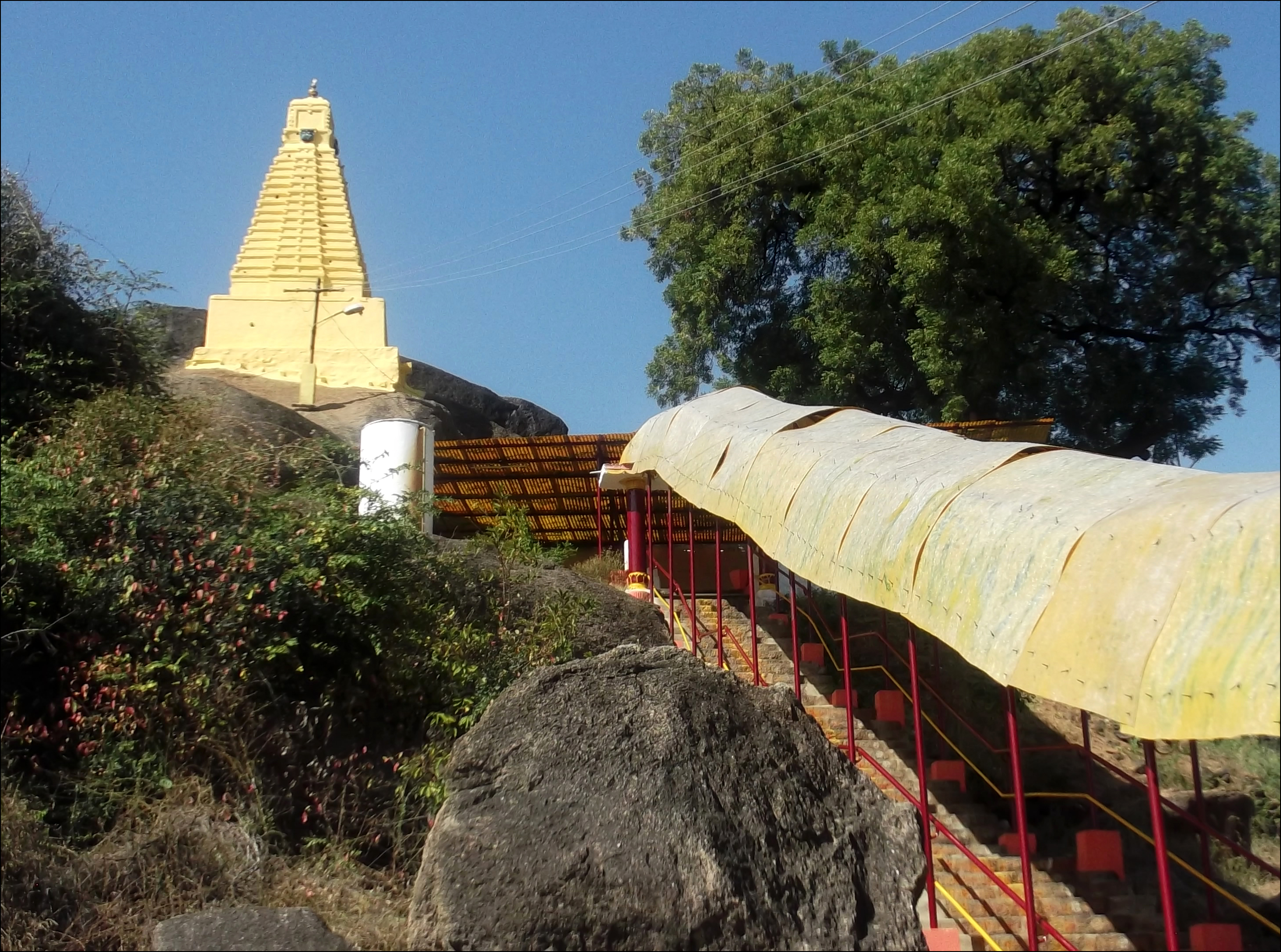
View of Padmakshi Temple

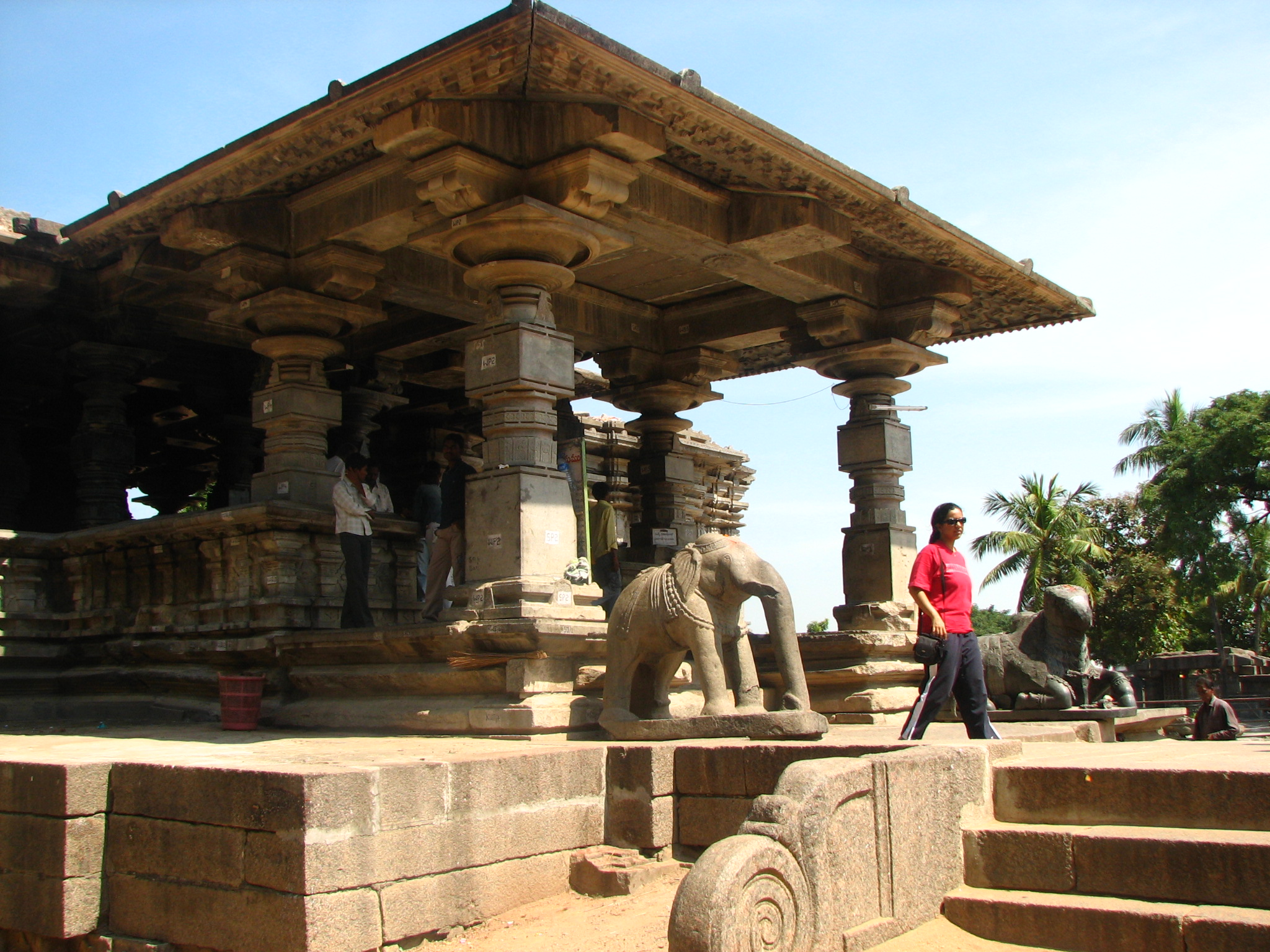
Thousand Pillar Temple

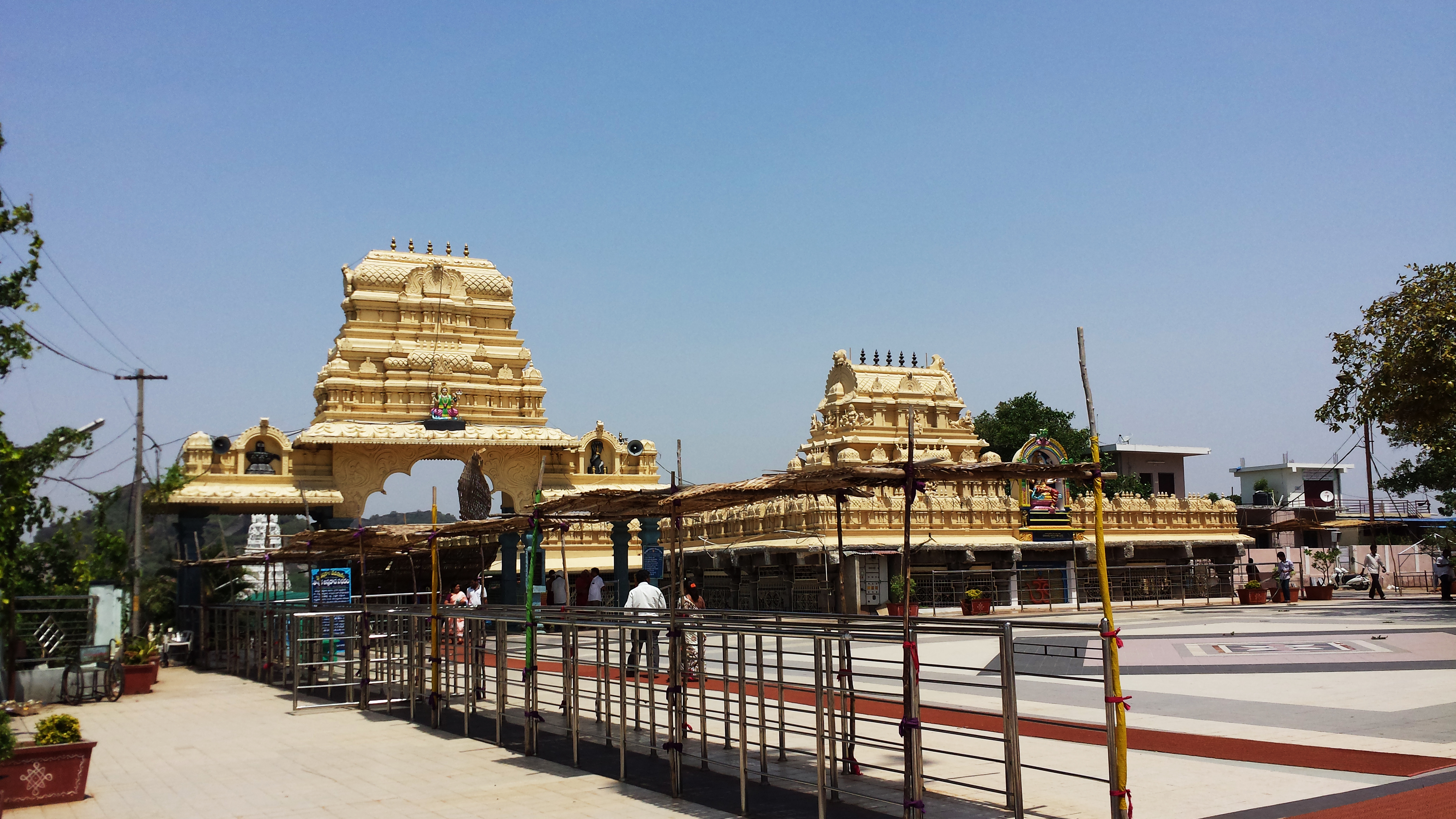
Bhadrakali Temple

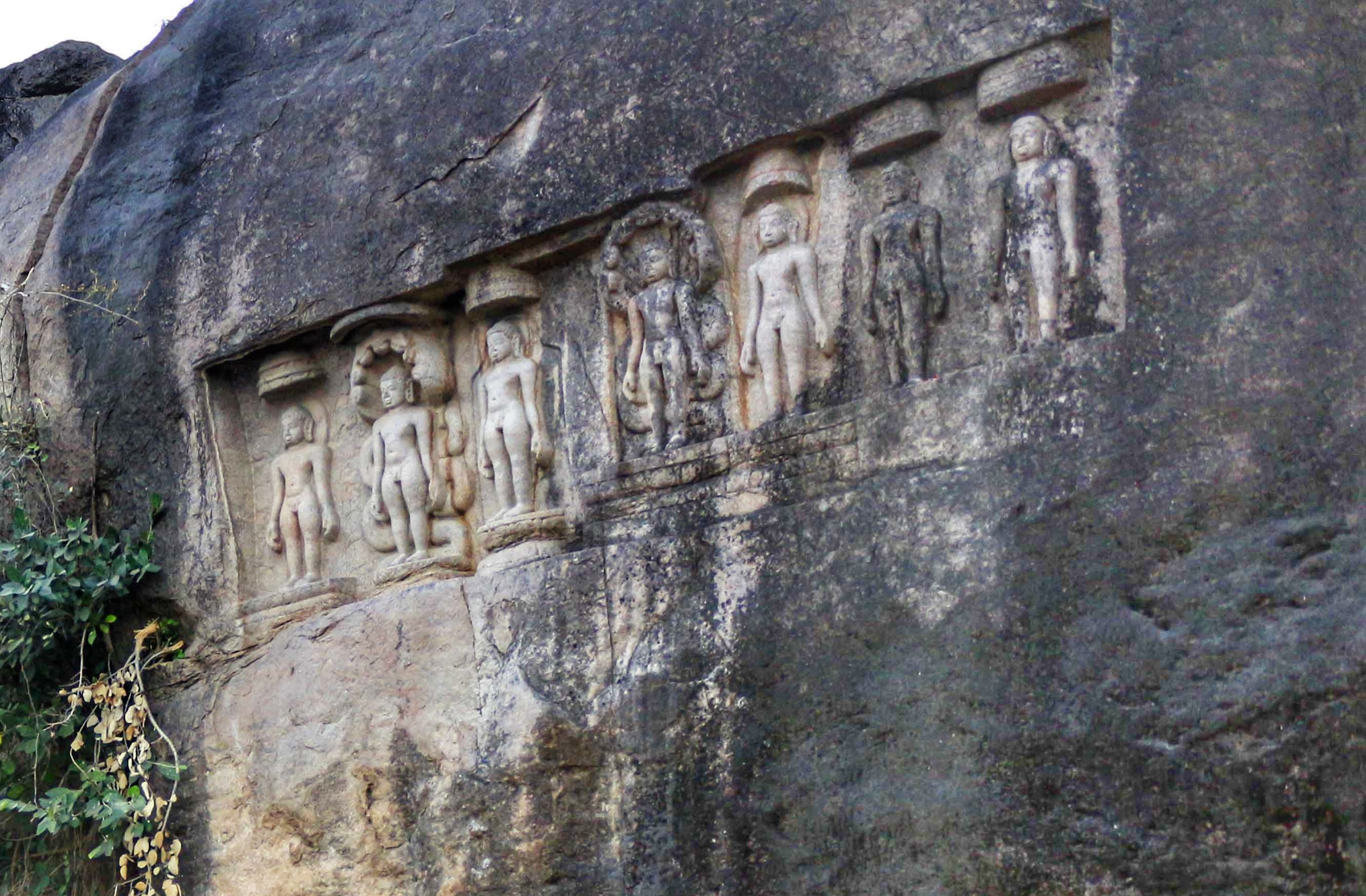
Aggalayya Gutta

1. Padmakshi Temple, believed to have been built during the first quarter of the 12th century, is a temple at Hanumakonda with Goddess Padmakshi as the main deity.
2. Thousand Pillar Temple was built during the period of the Kakatiya dynasty, and later destroyed by Muslim invaders. The temple called the Trikutalayam, dedicated to Shiva, Vishnu, and Surya.
3. Bhadrakali Temple at Hanumakonda is a significant Goddess Bhadrakali temple located on the hilltop.
4. Aggalayya Gutta is a historic Jain site situated on a hillock in Hanamkonda. The site contains monumental rock-cut images of Jain Tirthankaras, including an approximately 30-foot (9.1 m) image identified as Shantinatha and a 13-foot (4.0 m) image of Parshvanatha.

== Education ==
Kakatiya University is an autonomous educational institution, approved under Universities Grant Commission scheme.

Major universities and educational institutions of the area include, National Institute of Technology, Kakatiya University, University Arts and Science College, Kakatiya Medical College. .

== Transport ==
The public transport includes, metro bus services operated by TSRTC.

TSRTC operates buses from Hanumakonda district bus stand to various destinations like Hyderabad, Vijayawada, Bengaluru, Khammam, Suryapet, Visakhapatnam, Tirupathi, Srisailam, Rajahmundry, Eluru, Mulug, Sathupalli, Mantralayam, Nellore, Mahabubnagar, Guntur, Thorrur, Piduguralla, Jagadgirigutta, Sangareddy, Kaleshwaram, Jangaon, Jammikunta, Godavarikhani, Bellampalli, Mahabubabad, Bhupalapally, Bhadrachalam, Narsampet, Eturunagaram, Palakurthi, Wardhannapet, Devaruppula, Medaram, Huzurabad and Kamalapur.
