= Muhammad bin Tughluq (disambiguation) =

Muhammad bin Tughluq was the eighteenth sultan of the Delhi Sultanate.

Muhammad bin Tughluq may also refer to:

- Muhammad bin Tughluq (play), a 1968 play by Cho Ramaswamy
- Muhammad bin Tughluq (1971 film), directed by Cho Ramaswamy
- Muhammad bin Tughluq (1972 film), directed by B. V. Prasad
- Muhammad Bin Tughlaq: Tale of a Tyrant, a historical fiction novel by Anuja Chandramouli
