= Origin of the Vijayanagara Empire =

Topic in linguistic Indian history

The origin of the Vijayanagara Empire is a controversial topic in South Indian history, with regard to the linguistic affiliation of the founding dynasty, the Sangama family. The Vijayanagara Empire rose to power in southern India in the 14th century CE. Over the past decades historians have expressed differing opinions on whether the empire's founders, Harihara I and Bukka I (two of four sons of Sangama), were of Kannada people or Telugu origin. There are various opinions about role of the Vidyaranya, the Hindu saint and guru of Harihara I and Bukka I in the founding of the Vijayanagara Empire.

== Kannadiga origin theory ==
Scholars such as Rothermund, B.L Rice, P.B. Desai, Saletore, Henry Heras, Suryanatha Kamath, A. P. Karmarkar S.K. Aiyangar, William Coelho and M. H. Rama Sharma claim that the founders of the Vijayanagara Empire were Kannadigas and related to the Hoysala dynasty. E. W. West opines the founders were officers in the army of Veera Ballala III, the last Hoysala king. Though controversies over the role of Vidyaranya in the founding of the empire exist, it is well accepted that he was an important individual at the powerful Shringeri monastic order, though he became the head of the order around 1380, a few decades after the founding of the empire. According to these historians, modern epigraphic research and interpretation of these inscriptions (not available to earlier historians) support the theory that the founders of the empire were local princes under the service of the last of the Hoysala king. According to them, inscriptions prove that Harihara I and Bukka Raya I were in the Hoysala service a decade before their arrival at Kampili (in modern Bellary district). Not only did the widow of Hoysala Veera Ballala III participate in the coronation of Harihara I in 1346, her name appears before that of the founding King Harihara I in a 1349 inscription, indicating he gained legitimacy for being a devoted heir of the Hoysala legacy. Further, according to William Coelho and Heras, it is known that the original founding of the capital Vijayanagara was in 1320 by Veera Ballala III, the city then being known as Vijayavirupaksha Hosapattana. According to Eaton, By 1344, the transfer of power from the Hoysala Empire to the emerging Vijayanagara Empire seems to have been gradual and without bloodshed, as ex-Hoysala officers melted away from a crumbling Hoysala power to support the Sangama cause. Historian Kamath argues that in 1346, Harihara I made a grant to Bharati Tirtha, the Shringeri pontiff in the presence of Krishnayitayi, queen of the slain Hoysala king Veera Ballala III (who herself made a grant on the same day). Harihara I was a commander in the Hoysala Kingdom and had been appointed by Veera Ballala III with autonomous powers after the fall of the Seuna (Yadava dynasty) and Kampili kingdoms, to administer the northern territories. Also, the very first fortification that Harihara I built was at Barakuru in coastal Karnataka in 1336. He was a Hoysala commander in charge of its northern territories from his seat in Gutti (modern Ananthapur district of Andhra Pradesh), at that time a Hoysala territory. He assumed the Kannada titles Purvapaschima Samudradhishvara (lit, "Master of eastern and western and oceans"), Arirayavibhada (lit, "fire to the enemy kings") and Bhashegetappuvarayaraganda (lit, "punisher of the ruler who failed to keep a promise"). According to Kamath, when Veera Ballala III died fighting the Sultan of Madurai, Harihara I seems to have gained sovereign powers over the entire Hoysala territory.

The historian Saletore pointed out that even famous Telugu scholars such as Vallabharaya and Srinatha called the Sangama brothers Karnata Kshitinatha in their writings, indicating they were a Kannada family. An early inscription of Harihara II called him "Lion to the scent elephant of the Andhra king", demonstrating their anti-Telugu propensity. According to the epigraphist and historian P.B. Desai, the Persian author Ferishta of the Vijayanagara days wrote of the emperors "Roies of Karnataka". According to Kamath, the Kannada writings of that time such as Chikkadevaraya Vamshavali and Keladinripa Vijayam claim that the Sangama brothers were Kannadigas by linguistic affinity, making them people of Karnataka Regarding the earliest modern work written on the history of the Vijayanagara Empire by Robert Sewell (A Forgotten Empire, 1901) Kamath claims that Sewell had not used all sources but had copiously used travelogues and other works written by only European travelers to forward his theories.

Kamath points out that almost half of the Vijayanagara Empire inscriptions, out of a total of 7,000 available to us, are in Kannada. The Kings used titles such as Bhashegetappuva rayara ganda, Moorurayaraganda and Arirayadatta which are pure Kannada language titles. Their remaining inscriptions are in Sanskrit, Telugu, and Tamil. According to Appadurai, The "Karnataka Empire" or Vijayanagara Empire was originally of the Karnataka region and it drew its inspirations from the Hoysala Empire and the Western Ganga Dynasty of the Karnataka and the Chola and Pandya of the Tamil country. According to Henry Heras, inscriptional evidence shows that Ballappa Dandanayaka, a nephew of Hoysala Veera Ballala III was married to a daughter of Harihara I, the founding king of the empire. This is claimed proof enough of the association Sangama brothers had with the Hoysala family.

According to the historians Saletore, P.B. Desai and Henry Heras, the theory of capture of Harihara I and Bukka Raya I by the Sultan of Delhi and conversion to Islam is false and that the testimony of epigraphs proves that the area around Hampi constituted their homeland. The empire never had a Telugu origin. The patron saint of the early kings was saint Vidyaranya, the 12th Shankaracharya of Sringeri in Karnataka, and this is proof enough of their unquestionable identity with the Kannada country. About the Muslim records that claim a Telugu origin of Harihara I and Bukka Raya, these historians feel, the records are neither unanimous nor reliable in their claims. In those days of religious rigidity, it is too far-fetched to accept a theory of conversion to Islam and re-conversion to Hinduism while still managing to win the trust and loyalty of Hindu subjects in an hour of impending invasions. According to Kamath, the great devotion the founders of the empire had in Lord Chennakeshava of Belur and Lord Virupaksha of Hampi testifies to their origin from Kannada country, though in political and administrative matters, the Vijayanagara kings followed the Hoysala, Kakatiya, Chola framework in the various provincial regions of the empire. The Sangama brothers even signed their Sanskrit records in Kannada (as Srivirupaksha) and used their Kannada titles even in their Telugu, Tamil and Sanskrit records. No Telugu titles were used by them. A popular chieftain and patriot of those times, prince Kumara Rama of Kummata Durga or simply Kummata Durga (capital of the tiny Kampli kingdom in Bellary District) may have been related to Sangama, father of Harihar I. This evidence exists in a literary piece by poet Nanjunda (Kumara Rama Charita). According to Kamath, the early Vijayanagara kings raised memorials at Sandur, Chitradurga and Dharwad to sing the glory of Kumara Rama's valor and show their continued efforts to build an empire in his legacy. All this proves the matrimonial relations the Sangama family had with the Kummata family.

According to R. C. Dhere, founders of the Vijayanagara Empire were from present-day Karnataka. They claimed Yadava lineage and were of Kuruba origin. Their family deity (Kuladevata) was Virupaksha, who is a form of Shiva, and became the principal deity of the state during their reign. Virupaksha is derived from Virupaa in sanskrit which means diversly and aksha means eyes, i.e. one who has his eyes everywhere. Virappa, also known as Birappa, is a honorific version of Virupa where the suffix "-appa" indicates fatherhood in Kannada and Virappa is an exclusive deity of Kurubas. Sangamas worshiped Virupaksha together with other pastoralist god Vitthal and worship of Vitthal is consistent with other pastoralist Deccan dynasties, of Kannadiga origin, that claimed Yadava lineage (Hoysalas and Seunas). Inscriptions on the temples constructed by Vijayanagara Emperors in Lepakshi indicate that Vitthal and Virupaksha were originally worshiped as Vitthal and Birappa. Kurubas consider Vitthal and Birappa as brothers and worship them as inseparable companions. Dhere further looks at the sculptures on the various temples constructed by the Sangamas, where all the sculptures of human beings are dressed as Kurubas, indicating the family that built those temples.

Aiyangar opines that since the Kakatiya dynasty collapsed about 20 years before the demise of Veera Ballala III of Hoysala Empire in 1342 CE, and Hosapattana was established as a second capital by Veera Ballala III (which eventually became the capital of the Vijayanagara Empire) it would be impossible for Harihara, the founder of fledgling empire to attain such a high position in a short time without having close ties to Hoysala Empire.

The Vijayanagara kings make their first appearance as Mahamandalesvaras from the year A. D. 1336 under Hoysalas, to believe that they were the feudatories of Ballala. As stated before Balappa-dannayaka, the nephew ot Ballala was the son-in-law ot Harihara 1. It is therefore probable that Ballala brought about this connection and instituted the Vijayanagara chiefs In the fort of Vijayanagara, for the defence of the northern frontiers. Ballala, having given over the protection of his northern territories into the hands of Harihara and his brother, he directed his attention to the south, Ferishta says, a new fort was raised in the northern frontiers of Ballala's dominions carried by the name of Beejanuggur (Vijayanagara) after his son Beeja. Ballala had a son by the name of Vira Virupaksha Ballala Deva. One inscription in the Yedatore Taiuk informs us that Ballala had a son named Hampe-Vodeyar. Hampe is still the name of the site of Vijayanagara. Hampe-Vodeyar may be the same as VIra-Virupaksha Ballala. Ballala was residing at a new residence called Viru-pakshapattana or Virupaksha-Hosadurga; evidently a derivation of his son's name. As mentioned; eviousiy Rice has identified this latter place with Hosadurga in Chitradroog District. Fr. Heras has, however, identified it with the city of Vijayanagara, the capital of the Vijayanagara Empire. Ferishta probably heard that the city was named after Ballala's son and hence deduced his name “Beeja" from the then current name of the city. An inscription of A. D. 1380 gives the name of Virupaksha to the city of Vijayanagara. The temple of Virupaksha in that city indicates the original name. Virupaksha was also known as Hosadurga. Vijaya was not a new name to the Hoysalas. Ballala II is said to have made a fort called Vijayagir and once he was residing at Vijayapura or Hallavur. In A. D. 1354 Bukka I is said to have been residing at Hosapattana. All this epigraphical evidence may easily lead one to identify Virupaksha or Hosadurga with Vijayanagara. An inscription dated A. D. 1378 gives the description of the new town Hosapattana, which is the same as that of Vijayanagara "There, with the Tuhgabhadra as his foot-stool, and Hemakuta as his throne, he (Bukka) was seated like Virupaksha for the protection of the people of the earth” Vijayanagara is on the Tuhgabhadra, Hemakuta a hill in it, and Virupaksha its god. Thus the Vijayanagara empire was founded by the Hoysala and its chieftains.

== Telugu origin theory ==
Historians such as Robert Sewell, Dallapiccola, M.H. Ramasarma, Y. Subbarayalu, N. Venkataramanayya and B. Suryanarain Rao have attested the Telugu origin of Vijayanagara Empire. According to British traveler Francis Buchanan (1801), while on a visit to Beidur in Mysore (Karnataka), he was shown a Sanskrit book called Vidyaranya Sikka by a person called Ramappa Varmika. The book mentioned that the founders of Vijayanagara were Harihara and Bukka, and that they were guards of the treasury of the Kakatiya King Prataparudra of Warangal. The brothers met a spiritual teacher called Vidyaranya, the sage of Sringeri monastery, who guided them to establish the Kingdom of Vijayanagara to safeguard the Hindu religion. This was in 1336 and Harihara was made first king of the fledgling empire. Robert Sewell considered various such theories and concluded that Harihara and Bukka were treasury officers, in the court of Warangal, the capital of the (Kakatiya dynasty). Mansel Longworth Dames, a scholar of Portuguese language, in the translation of the Book of Duarte Barbosa attests that Sangama dynasty was of Kuruba origin. The Delhi Sultan who captured and converted the brothers to Islam, sent them back to put down the rebellion of Hoysala king. They succeeded in suppressing the rebellion but laid foundation of an independent kingdom at the behest of Vidyaranya.

Historians Venkataramanayya and Ramasarma supported the conclusions of Sewell based on his research and the information provided by the Sanskrit and Kannada treatises such as Vidyaranya Kalajnana (in Sanskrit), Vidyaranya Vrittanta, Rajakalanirnaya, Piramahasamhiti and Sivatatva Ratnakara (all in Kannada). According to the scholar Suryanarain Rao, who described seven traditional accounts of the origin of Harihara and Bukka, five were inclined towards a Telugu origin of the founding kings. According to Sreenivasa Rao, the Telugu identity of Hakka and Bukka and their devotion to the goddess Bhuvaneswari is also established. According to Subbarayalu, indirect evidences such as the employment of predominantly Telugu Nayaks (Kamma, Balija, Boya, Velama and Reddy people) for revenue collection throughout the empire also supported their Telugu affinity.

According to Gribble, Muslim scholars of the time, such as Ziauddin Barani, Isarni and Ferishta and foreign visitors such as Ibn Batuta and Nuniz also recorded that the Sangama brothers were serving King Prataparudra and were taken captive after the fall of Warangal. According to B.R. Gopal, who based his research on evidence gleaned from inscriptions such as the Gozalavidu record, the founders of Vijayanagara were at first in the service of the last Kakatiya king Prataparudra of Warangal. When that monarch was defeated by Muhammad bin Tughluq and taken prisoner, they fled to Kampili and took refuge in the court of Kampilideva. Venkataramanayya states that on the outbreak of a rebellion in Kampili the brothers were sent by Tughlaq with an army to Kampili to reconquer it from the rebels and rule the province as his deputies. According to M. Somesekhara Sarma, they successfully suppressed the rebellion, but under the influence of Vidyaranya renounced Islam and threw in their lot with the Andhra nationalists led by Musunuri Nayaks who had just then succeeded under the leadership of Kaapaya Nayaka in expelling the Muslims and re-establish the national independence. Professor Nilakanta Shastri claims that Harihara and Bukka then reverted to their ancient faith and having declared independence, assumed the leadership of the Hindus of Kampili in their fight against the Muslims.

According to Venkataramanaya, Kaapaya and Bukka had actively collaborated with each other to ward off the Muslim threat, probably because of their close association in the court of Warangal. He surmised that the establishment of Vijayanagara kingdom drew inspiration from the successful exploits of Musunuri Kapaya Nayak.

== Other theories of origin ==
A popular account says that the Hampi region was part of a Kampili kingdom in the 14th century when large parts of north India was under Muslim rule. In 1326 AD Muhammad bin Tughluq defeated and killed the king of Kampili. Among those taken prisoner were sons of Sangama, Hakka (Harihara I) and Bukka (Bukka Raya), both treasury officers of Kampili who were forced to convert to Islam. Some years later the brothers were sent back to govern Kampili. In 1336, The brothers laid the foundation of an independent kingdom, denying any subordination to the Tughluqs and became Hindu again.
