= Kotikanti Raghava =

Gandaraguli Kotikanti Raghava

Chief of The Aravidu Clan
- Monarch: Prataparudra II

Personal details
- Parent(s): Tata Pinnamaraju; Surambika
- Occupation: Commander

Military service
- Allegiance: Kakatiya Empire
- Branch/service: Kakatiya Army
- Rank: General
- Battles/wars: See list: Kakatiya-Kampili War

Kotikanti Raghava also known as Aravidu Raghava was the son of Tata Pinnamaraju, a feudatory of the Kakatiya ruler Prataparudra II and the half-brother of Somadevaraju. According to the Telugu literary work Bala Bhagavatam, Aravidu Raghava defeated Kampiliraya and deprived him of his royal insignia. during Kakatiya ruler Prataparudra's conflict with the ruler of Kampili.

== Family ==
Kotikanti Raghava was the son of Tata Pinnamaraju and his wife, Surambika. He was a member of the Aravidu clan and was the half-brother of Somadevaraju.

== Military career ==
=== Kakatiya-Kampili War ===
In 1319–1320 AD Prataparudra's relations with Kampili, a neighbouring Hindu kingdom to the south-west of the Kakatiya domains on the banks of the Tungabhadra River, became strained following Veera Ballala III's invasion of the principality. According to the Kannada work Kumara-Ramana-Sangatya, Kumara Rama the son of Kampiliraya sought Prataparudra's assistance against Veera Ballala III. Prataparudra then declined to intervene against the Hoysala king. In response, Kumara Rama turned against Prataparudra and deliberately encroached upon Kakatiya territory along the western frontier.

Prataparudra then dispatched his army to the frontier of Kampili. According to a verse in Srinatha's Telugu work Bhimesvara-Puranamu Bendapudi Annaya, one of Prataparudra's commanders destroyed Kummata the capital of Kampiliraya.

In the Telugu work Bala Bhagavata Kotikanti Raghava, one of the sons of the Aravidu chief Tata Pinnamaraju, a feudatory of the Kakatiyas is said to have defeated Kampiliraya and deprived him of his royal insignia. These literary works suggest that Prataparudra came into conflict with Kampiliraya and achieved some military victories over him, although he does not appear to have gained any significant territorial or material advantage from the conflict.

== See also ==
- Aravidu Dynasty
- Rama Raya
- Aravidu Somadevaraju
