= Siege of Kampili =

Delhi Sultanate's conquest of Kampili

Date	1326–1327
Location	Hampi, Karnataka 15°20′04″N 76°27′44″E
Result	Tughlaq victory: Fall of Kampili kingdom
Territorial changes	Entire peninsula from Tapti River to Cape Comorin annexed by the Delhi Sultanate

Belligerents
Delhi sultanate	Kampili kingdom

Commanders and leaders
Muhammad bin Tughluq; Malik Zada; Khwaja Jahan	Kampilideva †; Kumara Rama
- Location within Karnataka Siege of Kampili (India)

The siege of Kampili (1326–1327), was a major conflict during the reign of Muhammad bin Tughlaq, sparked by the rebellion of his cousin, Bahaudin Gurshasp, governor of Sagar. After being defeated by the Sultan’s forces, Bahaudin sought refuge with the king of Kampili, giving Tughlaq an excuse to attack the kingdom. The Imperial forces, led by Malik Zada, faced strong resistance and were defeated twice at Kummata by the Kampili forces, who were supported by Reddi nobles. This alliance led the Reddis to adopt the title "Gujjaritattuvibhāla" (the destroyer of Gujjara Cavalry). The siege was an important event in South Indian history, showcasing the struggle between the Delhi Sultanate and Kampili kingdom for control of the Deccan.

== Background ==
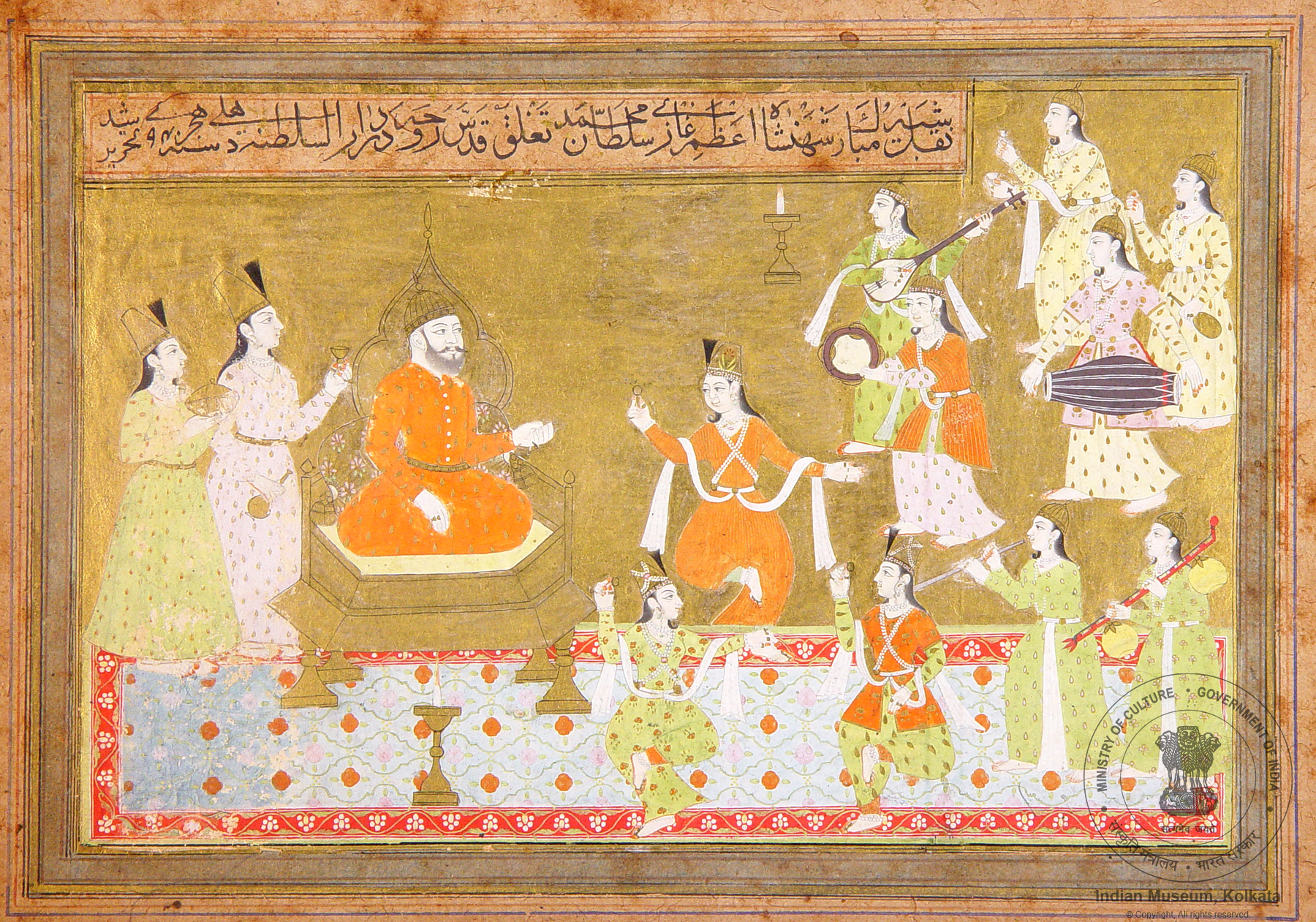
Muhammad bin Tughlaq seated on the throne. Indian Museum, Kolkata

In 1325, Jauna Khan became the Delhi's sultan and assumed the name Muhammad bin Tughlaq. In 1327, Bahaudin Gurshasp, Muhammad bin Tughluq's first cousin and governor of Sagar, rebelled against the king and aimed for the Delhi throne. He attacked loyal chiefs, forcing them to seek refuge in Mando. Tughauq sent his Gujarat forces to defeat Bahaudin, who, despite his initial success, lost the battle due to the defection of his officer, Khizr Bahrani. Bahaudin fled to Sagar, then moved his family and wealth to Kampila, seeking protection from the Kampilideva, the Raya of Kampili. The shelter given to Bahaudin by its king offered Muhammad Tughlaq a fine excuse to declare war on Kampili.

The siege of Kampili was part of Muhammad bin Tughlaq's larger military campaigns in the Deccan, aimed at consolidating control in the region. The conflict was characterized by intense fighting and strategic maneuvers as both sides sought to gain the upper hand. Overall, the siege of the Kampili under Muhammad bin Tughlaq was a significant episode in South Indian history, shaping the power dynamics and influence in the Deccan region during the 14th century.

== Battles ==
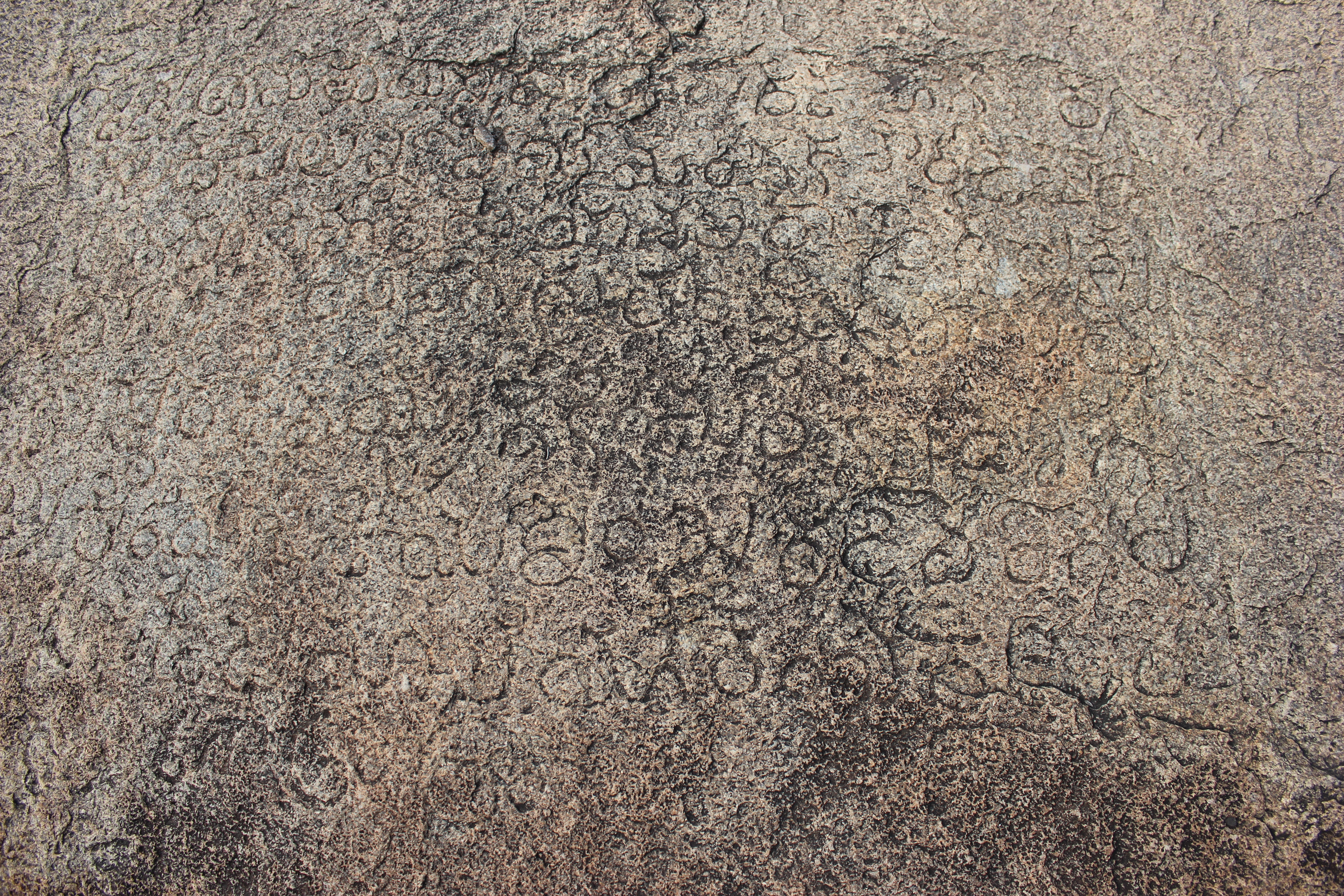
Inscriptions of Kampilideva Raya, at Kampili

Under the command of Malik Zada, the forces of the Delhi Sultanate were dispatched by the Emperor to advance against the Kampili kingdom. The Imperial forces continued their pursuit of the rebels where they were defeated twice by the local Hindu forces. This may have been the occasion when the Reddi nobles, in alliance with the king of Kampili, defeated the Gujarat Imperial forces and adopted the title "Gujjaratattuvibhala." Vema, along with his brothers and relatives, likely allied with the Kampili king in this conflict against their common adversary, Muhammad-bin-Tughlaq. This event occurred in A.H. 727 (1326–27 CE).

In the third expedition they laid a siege on the fort of Kummata. The sultanate's forces assaulted and captured one of the gates of the fort. Kampiladeva and his protege, together with their families and retainers, escaped to Anegondi. Tughlaq successfully captured Kummata, pursued the fugitives, and surrounded Anegondi from all sides. The garrison had no way of escape, and as the days passed they faced starvation and death. Kampiladeva lost all hopes of victory. He sent away Bahauddin to seek asylum at the court of Ballala III (r. 1292–1342), and prepared for the worst. The women sacrificed themselves committing jauhar. Kampilideva opened the gates of the citadel and fought melee where he and his followers were slain.

== Aftermath ==
The conquered region was put in charge of the Malik Naib. Ballala III fearing the loose of his kingdom avoided conflict and handed over Bahauddin to Muhammad bin Tughlaq. Thus practically the entire peninsula from Tapti River to Cape Comorin was conquered by the Delhi Sultanate.

== See also ==
- Siege of Kangra Fort
- Muhammad bin Tughluq

== Bibliography ==
- Habib, Mohammad; Nizami, Khaliq Ahmad, eds. (1970). A Comprehensive History of India: The Delhi Sultanat (A.D. 1206-1526). Vol. V. People's Publishing House.
