= List of wars involving the Delhi Sultanate =

Delhi Sultanate was a Muslim empire based in Delhi that stretched over large parts of the Indian subcontinent for 320 years (1206-1526). Following the invasion of Southern Asia by the Ghurid dynasty, Qutbuddin Aibak Was the first sultan of Delhi Sultanate, five dynasties ruled over the Delhi Sultanate sequentially: the Mamluk dynasty (1206-1290), the Khalji dynasty (1290-1320), the Tughlaq dynasty (1320 1414), the Sayyid dynasty (1414-1451), and the Lodi dynasty (1451-1526) later replaced by Mughal Empire. It covered large swaths of territory in modern-day India, Pakistan, and Bangladesh as well as some parts of southern Nepal. Delhi Sultanate Start their Expansion During Iltutmish and Later during Alauddin Khalji reign, who captured Rajputana, South India. The empire reached its territorial peak during the Tughlaq dynasty and subsequently declined after Timur's invasion.

== Mamluk dynasty ==
Name of conflict(time)	Delhi Sultanate	Opposition	outcome
Battle of Bhutala (1222-1229)	Mamluk dynasty (Delhi)	Guhila dynasty	Mewar Victory
Siege of Ranthambore (1226)	Mamluk dynasty (Delhi)	Chahamanas of Ranastambhapura (Rajputs)	Mamluk victory
Siege of Mandore (1227)	Mamluk dynasty (Delhi)	Rajputs	Mamluk victory
Siege of Jalore (1228)	Mamluk dynasty (Delhi)	Chahamanas of Jalor (Rajputs)	Mamluk victory
Siege of Gwalior (1231)	Mamluk dynasty (Delhi)	Rajputs	Mamluk victory
Siege of Kalinjar (1232)	Mamluk dynasty (Delhi)	Rajputs	Mamluk victory
Siege of Bayana (1234)	Mamluk dynasty (Delhi)	Rajputs	Mamluk victory
Mamluk conquest of Malwa (1234–35)	Mamluk dynasty (Delhi)	Paramara Rajputs	Mamluk victory
Siege of Ranthambhore (1236)	Mamluk dynasty (Delhi)	Chauhans of Ranthambhore	Chauhan Victory
Battle of Katasin (1243)	Mamluk dynasty (Delhi)	Eastern Ganga dynasty	Eastern Ganga Victory
Mongol Siege of Uch (1246)	Mamluk dynasty	Chagatai Khanate	Stalemate
Siege of Ranthambore (1259)	Mamluk dynasty (Delhi)	Chauhans of Ranthambhore	Mamluk victory
Balban's campaigns in Mewat (1260–61)	Mamluk dynasty	Mewatis (Jadaun Rajputs)	Mamluk victory
Battle of Beas River (1285)	Mamluk dynasty	Chagatai Khanate	Mamluk victory
Balban's conquest of Bengal (1277–1281)	Mamluk dynasty	Bengal	Mamluk victory

== Khalji dynasty ==
Name of conflict(time)	Delhi Sultanate	Opposition	outcome
Khalji Revolution (1290)	Khalji faction	Mamluk Dynasty (Delhi)	Khalji victory: Establishment of the Khalji dynasty
Siege of Jhain (1291)	Khalji dynasty	Chahamanas(Rajputs)	Khalji Victory
Siege of Malwa (1291)	Khalji dynasty	Rajputs	Khalji Victory
Siege of Mandawar (1292)	Khalji dynasty	Chahamanas(Rajputs)	Khalji Victory
Alauddin Khalji's raid on Bhilsa (1293)	Khalji dynasty	Paramara dynasty(Rajputs)	Khalji Victory
Battle of Lasanra (1293)	Khalji dynasty	Kanhan(a Hindu chief)	Khalji Victory
Alauddin Khalji's raid on Devagiri (1296)	Khalji dynasty	Yadav's of Devgiri	Khalji Victory
Mongol invasion of India (1297-1298)	Khalji dynasty	Chagatai Khanate	Khalji Victory
Mongol invasion of Sindh (1298)	Khalji dynasty	Mongols	Khalji Victory
Alauddin Khalji's conquest of Gujarat (1298-1304)	Khalji dynasty	Vaghela dynasty	Khalji's Victory
Battle of Kili (1299)	Khalji dynasty	Chagatai Khanate	Khalji Victory
Alauddin Khalji's conquest of Ranthambore (1301)	Khalji dynasty	Chahamanas of Ranastambhapura	Khalji Victory
Mongol invasion of India (1303)	Khalji dynasty	Chagatai Khanate	Khalji Victory
Siege of Chittorgarh (1303)	Khalji dynasty	Guhila dynasty	Khalji Victory
Alauddin Khalji's conquest of Malwa (1305)	Khalji dynasty	Paramara dynasty	Khalji Victory
Battle of Amroha (1305)	Khalji dynasty	Chagatai Khanate	Khalji Victory
Mongol invasion of India (1306)	Khalji dynasty	Chagatai Khanate	Khalji Victory
Siege of Siwana (1308)	Khalji dynasty	Paramaras of Siwana	Khalji Victory
Alauddin Khalji's conquest of Devagiri (1308)	Khalji dynasty	Yadav's of Devagiri	Khalji Victory
Siege of Dwarasamudra (1310)	Khalji dynasty	Hoysala dynasty	Khalji Victory
Siege of Warangal (1310)	Khalji dynasty	Kakatiya dynasty	Khalji Victory
Malik Kafur's invasion of the Pandya kingdom (1310-1311)	Khalji dynasty	Pandya kingdom	Khalji Victory
Alauddin Khalji's conquest of Jalore (1311)	Khalji dynasty	Chahamanas of Jalore	Khalji Victory
Siege of Warangal (1318)	Khalji dynasty	Kakatiya dynasty	Khalji Victory

== Tughlaq dynasty ==
Name of conflict (time)	Delhi Sultanate	Opposition	outcome
Battle of Saraswati (1320)	Khusrau Khan	Tughlaq dynasty	Tughlaq victory
Battle of Lahrawat (1320)	Khusrau Khan	Tughlaq dynasty	Tughlaq victory
Siege of Warangal (1323)	Tughlaq dynasty	Kakatiya dynasty	Tughlaq victory
Tughlaq conquest of Bengal (1324)	Tughlaq dynasty	Bengal	Tughlaq victory
Tughlaq invasions of Orissa (1324, 1360)	Tughlaq dynasty	Eastern Ganga dynasty	Tughlaq victory
Siege of Kampili (1326–27)	Tughlaq dynasty	Kampili kingdom	Tughlaq victory: Fall of Kampili Kingdom
Capture of Sinhagad (1328)	Tughlaq dynasty	Kingdom of Sinhagad	Tughlaq victory: Sinhagad captured; Nag Nayak surrenders.
Battle of Singoli (1336)	Tughlaq dynasty	Sisodia dynasty	Mewar victory
Siege of Jaisalmer	Tughlaq dynasty	Jaisalmer State	Tughlaq victory: King duda and his son Tilak singh lost their lives.; 16000 women committed suicide.
Rebellion of Ismail Mukh	Tughlaq dynasty	Bahmani Kingdom	Bahmani victory
First Ekdala War	Tughlaq dynasty	Bengal Sultanate	Tughlaq victory
Second Ekdala War	Tughlaq dynasty	Bengal Sultanate	Peace treaty
Siege of Kangra Fort (1361–1370)	Tughlaq dynasty	Nagarkot	Tughlaq victory
Battle of Bakrol	Tughlaq dynasty	Sisodia dynasty	Mewar victory
Battle of Badnor	Tughlaq dynasty	Sisodia dynasty	Mewar victory
Siege of Multan (1398)	Tughlaq dynasty	Timurid Empire	Timurid victory
Sack of Delhi (1398)	Tughlaq dynasty	Timurid Empire	Timurid victory

== Sayyid dynasty ==
Name of conflict(time)	Delhi Sultanate	Opposition	outcome
Jasrat's rebellion	Sayyid dynasty	Khokhars under Jasrat	Khokhar victory

== Lodi dynasty ==
Name of conflict(time)	Delhi Sultanate	Opposition	outcome
Lodi–Sharqi War (1451–1500)	Lodi dynasty	Jaunpur Sultanate	Lodi Victory: Fall of Jaunpur Sultanate
Lodi–Tomaras War (1501–1507)	Lodi dynasty	Tanwars of DholpurTomaras of Gwalior	Lodi Victory
Battle of Khatoli (1517)	Lodi dynasty	Sisodia dynasty	Mewar Victory
Siege of Gwalior (1518)	Lodi dynasty	Tomaras of Gwalior	Lodi Victory
Battle of Dholpur (1519)	Lodi dynasty	Sisodia dynasty	Mewar Victory
Battle of Ranthambhore (1521)	Lodi dynasty	Sisodia dynasty	Mewar Victory
First Battle of Panipat (1526)	Lodi dynasty	Mughal Empire	Mughal Victory

== Bibliography ==
- K. A. Nizami (1970). A Comprehensive History of India: The Delhi Sultanat, A.D. 1206-1526, edited by Mohammad Habib and Khaliq Ahmad Nizami. People's Publishing House.
