= Aravidu Somadevaraju =

Indian ruler of the Kurnool region

Virapratapa Purigolasuratrana Rayaranaranga Bhibhatsa Asibharanapatima Sahadeva Gandaraganda Aravidu Somadevaraju

Raja of Aravidu

Personal details
- Parent: Tata Pinnamaraju (father)

Military service
- Battles/wars: Wars With Delhi Sultanate; Capture of Mosalimadugu; Capture of Satanikota; Capture of Kurnool; Capture of Kalavakolanu; Capture of Etgir; Battle of Ganginenikonda; Siege of Manigilla; Battle of Nagulapadu; Battle of Sara; Battle of Kunti; Battle of Raichur; Battle of Mudgal; Battle of Anegondi

Aravidu Somadevaraju also known as Somadeva was a ruler of the Kurnool region during the 14th century. When the Delhi Sultanate expanded into the south under Muhammad bin Tughlaq he rose in rebellion against their rule. In his struggle, he fought and defeated Malik Muhammad the governor of Kampili and took control of important forts such as Raichur, Mudgal, and Anegondi. he was the ancestor of the Aravidu dynasty his descendants later became emperors of the Vijayanagara Empire.

== Origin ==
Aravidu Somadevaraju was born into a Chandravanshi Kshatriya family. he was the son of Tata Pinnamaraju and his wife Konkala Devi and the ancestor of the Aravidu Clan. his descendants later became emperors of the Vijayanagara Empire.

== Military career ==
=== Rebellion Against Delhi Sultanate ===
After the conquest of the Kakatiya kingdom by Muhammad bin Tughlaq many local chiefs in Andhra and Telangana became unhappy with the rule of the Delhi Sultanate. They rose in rebellion under the leadership of Musunuri Prolaya Nayaka and his cousin Musunuri Kapaya Nayaka. At the same time in the western Telugu region the people who were under Malik Muhammad the governor of Kampili also rose against his authority. According to the Portuguese chronicler Fernão Nunes the people revolted as soon as the Sultan left the region. They refused to pay taxes and resisted the Sultanate officers. In the area around Kandanavolu (Kurnool) Aravidu Somadevaraju led the movement and organized efforts to drive out the Delhi Sultanate’s control from his region.

=== War ===
Aravidu Somadevaraju gathered his followers and began attacking the forts that were under the control of the Sultan of Delhi and his local officers. According to the Aravidu family records he captured fourteen forts in single campaign including Mosalimadugu, Satanikota, Kandanavolu (Kurnool), Kalvakolanu, Racur (Raichur), Elagiri (Etgir), and Ganginenikonda. He also fought many battles at Nagulapadu, Mudgal, Anegondi, Kunti, and Sara, where he defeated and killed several chiefs who stood against him. Most of these places lie within the regions of present-day Kurnool, Bellary, and Raichur. This area had once belonged to the Raya of Kampili but later came under the rule of the Sultan of Delhi after 1327 A.D. Somadeva had to fight against the Sultan's forces to take back these lands and in his efforts he received support from Prolaya Vema Reddy and the Pasupula chiefs.

==== Battle of Ganginenikonda ====
Nada Bala Nayaka, Gujjala Viri Nidu, Rudrapa Nayaka, Gaura Reddy, and Gangi Nayaka were subordinate chiefs serving under Malik Muhammad. They joined and formed a confederacy to stop Aravidu Somadevaraju, who was rapidly gaining control in the region. However, Somadevaraju met them in battle at Ganginenikonda and defeated their combined forces. After their defeat the chiefs withdrew into the fort hoping to protect themselves behind its strong walls. Somadevaraju did not allow them to recover. He laid siege to the fort stormed it after fierce fighting and killed the chiefs.

==== Siege of Manigilla ====
The Manne chief Gosangi who was holding the fort of Manigilla resisted strongly but was finally defeated. After the fort was captured he was taken prisoner by Aravidu Somadevaraju. Gosangi was later offered as a sacrifice to Kala Bhairava It is also believed that Somadeva received support from the Pasupula chiefs during his attack on Manigilla.

=== Campaign Against Malik Muhammad ===
Malik Muhammad who was the governor of Kampili under the Delhi Sultan, tried several times to stop Aravidu Somadevaraju but he was defeated again and again and forced to retreat. Important forts like Kunti, Anegondi, Raichur, and Mudgal had earlier been taken by the Sultan during the conquest of Kampili and Malik Muhammad was responsible for protecting them. When Somadeva attacked these strongholds open fighting followed. In the final encounter, Malik Muhammad along with 6,000 cavalry fell into Somadeva's hands. He later secured his release by agreeing to accept Somadeva's supremacy.

== Family ==
Aravidu Somadevaraju married Kamaladevi and they had a son named Raghavaraju.

== Titles ==
- Sakalanaradeva Choodamani
- Virapratapa
- Saranagatatrana
- Rayaranaranga Bhibhatsa
- Purigolasuratrana
- Asibharanapatima Sahadeva
- Svabhava Gambhirambhonidhi
- Satvagunavasudeva
- Virakshetra Bharatimalla
- Hosabirudaraganda
- Gandaraganda
- Rayarahuttaraganda
- Birudumanne Raganda
- Tatapinnamaraja Tanuja

== See also ==
- Aravidu Dynasty
- Muhammad Bin Thuglaq
- Vijayanagara Empire
- Aliya Rama Raya
