= Siege of Kangra Fort =

Military expedition between 1361 and 1370

Siege of Kangra fort
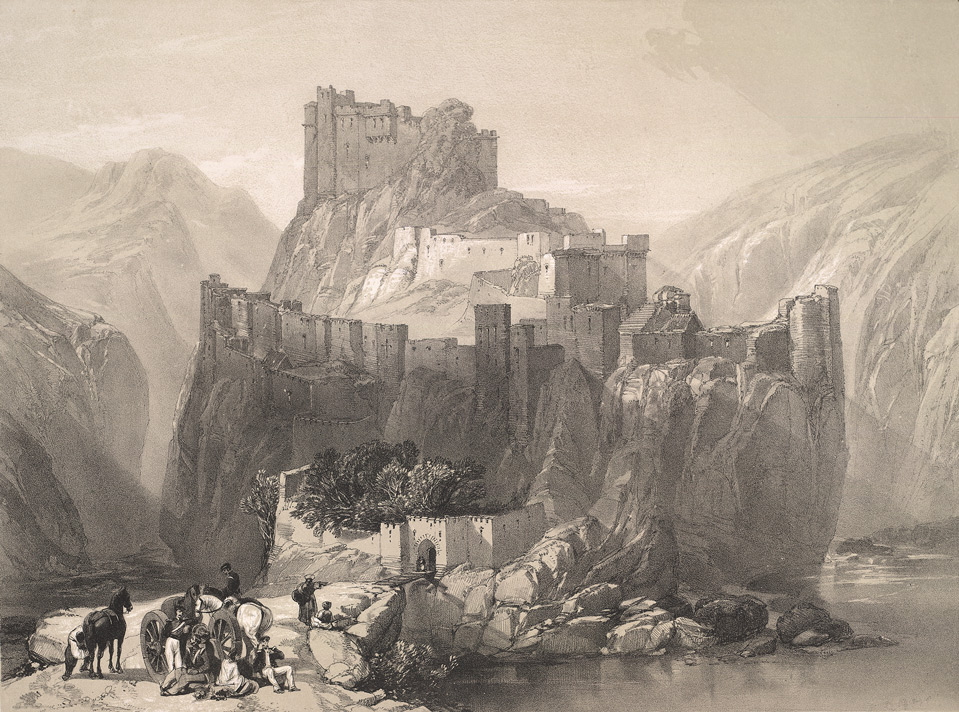
- Kangra fort in 1847, by Charles Hardinge
Date	Between 1361 and 1370
Location	Kangra Fort 32.08687°N 76.25446°E
Result	Delhi Sultanate victory
Territorial changes	Nagarkot is annexed by the Delhi Sultanate

Belligerents
Delhi sultanate	Nagarkot

Commanders and leaders
Firuz Shah Tughlaq	Raja Rup Chand (Note: The name Rupachandra is given by a later writer Manik Chand in a poem composed in 1562 CE to Raja Rup Chand)

The siege of Kangra Fort was a military expedition conducted by the forces of Delhi Sultanate led by Firuz Shah Tughlaq against the Raja Rup Chand, the ruler of Nagarkot (Kangra Fort). After a six-month siege, which occurred sometime between 1361 and 1370, the garrison surrendered and Raja Rup Chand submitted to the rule of the Delhi Sultanate.

== Background ==
Kangra fort was previously captured by Muhammad bin Tughluq in an expedition against Nagarkot rulers in 1337. The fort fell again to the Hindu rulers after the death of Muhammad bin Tughluq in 1351 and remained in their possession until it was re-captured by Firuz Shah Tughlaq. The campaign by Firuz Shah was launched as a result of an incursion by the Raja of Nagarkot into the Delhi Sultanate domain, who also intended to eliminate Muslim rulers in the region.

According to Firishta, the Raja of Nagarkot met Shihabu'd-Din Shah at the banks of Sutlej. Ud-Din Shah was a powerful ruler of Shah Mir dynasty in Kashmir. The Raja was on his way home after pillaging areas inside the Delhi sultanate. He presented the spoils gathered from his incursion to the ruler, Shihabu'd-Din Shah, to demonstrate his loyalty.

== Siege ==
Kangra fort on the map

After a successful expedition in Jamnagar in Bengal by the Delhi Sultanate, Firuz Shah moved his army towards Daulatabad, but then returned towards Delhi. Later Firuz Shah and the army changed their route and marched towards Nagarkot. On the way to Nagarkot, Firuz Shah instructed his men to order many Manjaniqs and many Arradas (Note: The Arradas and Manjaniqs were machines or cannons used by Dehlin sultanate which threw projectiles) to assemble, after he assessed the fort to be well built and not easily run over. The siege lasted six months before it was captured. Firuz Shah saw Raja Rup Chand, who stood on top of the citadel when Firuz Shah was inspecting the fort. The Raja pretended to be meek and bowed towards Firuz Shah in submission.

Firuz Shah in return took a handkerchief and waved it at the Raja who in return came from his fort to Firuz Shah. He apologized and lowered himself to Firoz Shah's feet. The Raja was gifted an umbrella and robes of honor were presented before he was sent back to his fort. One source claimed that Firuz Shah placed his hand on Raja's back and stated his name, which was not supplied by many other historians.

Following the Raja's submission Raja, Firuz Shah returned to Delhi. The dominion of the Raja was spared, he himself being left in charge of the garrison.

== Aftermath ==
The book Dalil-i-Firozshahi comprised religious books gathered by Firuz Shah. It was taken from Jawalamukhi temple during the return from Nagarkot. The campaign against Nagarkot was appraised as Firuz Shah's most successful. In later years, Nasir ud din Muhammad Shah III (son of Firuz Shah) used the fort to hide when pursued by Ghiyas-ud-Din Tughlaq II in 1388.

== See also ==
- Kangra district
- Siege of Kampili
- Siege of Warangal (1323)
- List of wars involving the Delhi Sultanate
