= Gandugali Kumara Rama =

2006 film by H. R. Bhargava

- DVD cover
- Directed by: H. R. Bhargava
- Screenplay by: Veerappa Maralavadi; H. R. Bhargava
- Story by: Su. Rudramurthy Shastry
- Produced by: Anitha Pattabhiram
- Starring: Shiva Rajkumar; Rambha; Anitha; Laya
- Cinematography: Sundarnath Suvarna
- Edited by: P. R. Soundar Raj
- Music by: Gurukiran
- Production company: M. S. Ramaiah Chitralaya
- Release date: 4 August 2006
- Running time: 159 minutes
- Country: India
- Language: Kannada

Gandugali Kumara Rama is a 2006 Indian Kannada-language biographical film based on the life of Kumara Rama (1290 AD – 1320 AD), who is considered to be the warrior prince prior to the establishment of the Vijayanagara Empire. Directed by H. R. Bhargava and produced by Anitha Pattabhiram, the film threads the path of a novel written by Su. Rudramurthy Shastry. The film stars Shiva Rajkumar in dual roles with Rambha, Laya and Anita Hassanandani in pivotal roles. It was during the filming of this movie that Shivrajkumar's father and veteran actor Rajkumar died.

== Legend ==
Kampili in Karnataka was ruled by Maharaja Devaraya, who had successfully resisted the Yadavas or Seunas of Devagiri, Kakatiyas and Hoysalas. His son Yuvaraja Ramanatha, popularly known as Kumara Rama (1290–1320), a great hero, was exiled due to the intrigues of his step mother. He is still remembered and worshipped in every part of Karnataka and also in some bordering districts of Andhra Pradesh irrespective of castes. Many castes, especially agrarian communities, considered him as their family deity and organise fairs and festivals every year in and around Karnataka. The Kings of Kampili belonged to the Valmiki Nayaka lineage of Kshatriya Bedar tribe, locally known as Bedars, Ramoshis and Boyars. Harihara I and Bukka Raya I, the founders of great Vijayanagara Empire were the nephews of prince Kumara Rama. The mother of these two brothers was Maravve Nayakiti, the elder sister of Prince Kumara Rama.

== Cast ==
- Shiva Rajkumar as Kumara Rama/Channa Rama
- Rambha
- Laya
- Anita Hassanandani
- Ashok
- Srinivasa Murthy
- C. R. Simha
- Avinash
- Ramesh Bhat
- Seetha
- Sumithra
- Doddanna
- Suchitra
- Bhagyashree
- Kishore
- Dharma
- Aravind
- Karibasavaiah
- Honnavalli Krishna

== Soundtrack ==
The soundtrack for the movie was composed by Gurukiran.

Gandugali Kumara Rama

Studio album by Gurukiran
- Released: 29 June 2006
- Genre: Feature film soundtrack
- Label: Akash Audio

No.	Song	Singers	Length (m:ss)	Lyrics
1	"Sarasake Baaro"	Hariharan, Nithyashree Mahadevan		Kaviraj
2	"Ee Jeeva Jeeva"	Udit Narayan, Madhu Balakrishnan		Rudramurthy Shastry
3	"O Prema"	SPB, Chitra		M. N. Vyasarao
4	"Kumara Rama"	Shankar Mahadevan		Shyamsundar
5	"Lelepaadi"	Malathi, Mano		Sriranga
6	"Ginirama"	Gurukiran, Komala Pothraj		V. Manohar
