= Muhammad Bin Tughlaq: Tale of a Tyrant =

Fiction novel by Anuja Chandramouli

- First edition
- Author: Anuja Chandramouli
- Language: English
- Genre: Historical fiction
- Published: 2019
- Publisher: Penguin Random House
- Publication place: India

Muhammad Bin Tughlaq: Tale of a Tyrant is a historical fiction novel by Indian author, Anuja Chandramouli. It was published in 2019 by Penguin Random House.

== Reception ==
The book was listed in the "20 most talked about Indian books" by Times of India. Deccan Herald also listed book in "Book Rack". Urmi Chanda-Vaz, writing for scroll.in, described the book as a "gory story" that is "formulaic and shallow".
