= Kampilideva =

2nd and last ruler of the Kampili kingdom
- Reign: 1300 AD- 1327/1328 AD
- Predecessor: Singeya Nayaka III (1280–1300 AD)
- Successor: Monarchy abolished, Kampili kingdom became a part of the Delhi Sultanate
- Issue: Kumara Rama, Maravve Nayakiti
- Father: Singeya Nayaka III (1280–1300 AD)

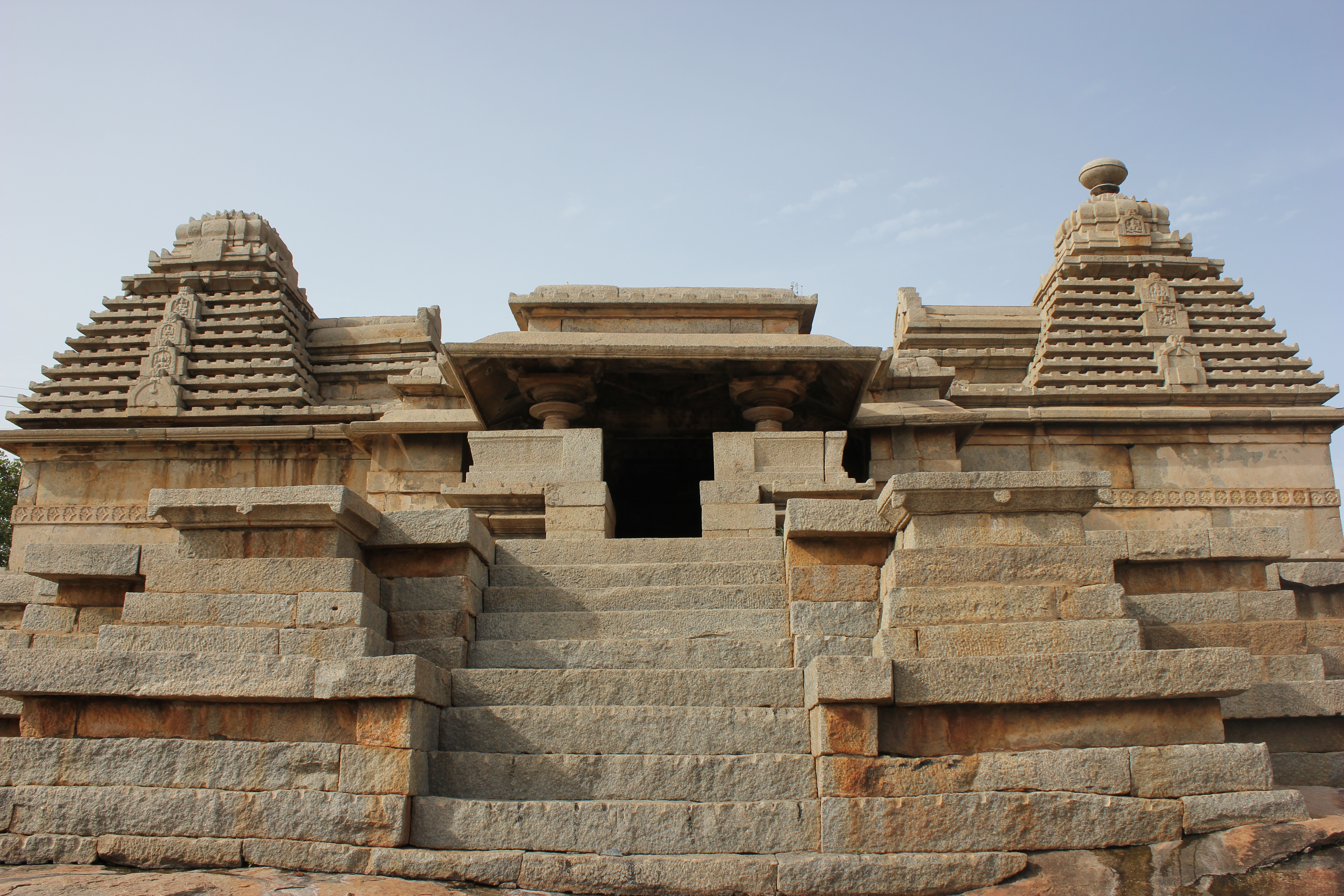
Shiva temple on Hemakuta hill in Hampi was built by Kampili Raya.

Kampilideva was the second and last king of the Kampili kingdom, succeeding his father, Singeya Nayaka III (1280–1300 AD) in 1300 AD. His son, prince Kumara Rama helped him wage wars against the Kakatiya dynasty of Warangal, the Hoysala Empire, and the sultan of Delhi, Muhammad bin Tughlaq. Kampilideva and his son Kumara Rama died battling the forces of Muhammad bin Tughlaq.

== Death ==
In 1327/1328 CE, the armies of Muhammad bin Tughlaq from Northern India attacked the kingdom of Kampilideva, i.e. the Kampili kingdom, which was one of the last independent Hindu kingdoms in the Indian subcontinent. The women of the royal household committed jauhar (ritual mass suicide) when it faced a certain defeat. Kampilideva and his son, Kumara Rama, died on the battlefield. After this, the Vijayanagara Empire was founded by the brothers Harihara and Bukka.
