= Tughlaq invasions of Orissa =

13th century campaigns in Orissa

Date	c. 1324, 1360
Location	Odisha, Eastern Ganga dynasty
Result	Delhi Sultanate victory: Eastern Ganga dynasty becomes tributary of Delhi Sultanate

Belligerents
Delhi Sultanate	Eastern Ganga dynasty

Commanders and leaders
Muhammad bin Tughluq; Firuz Shah Tughlaq; Ayn al-Mulk Mahru	Bhanudeva II; Bhanudeva III; Bali Putra; Ahmad Khan

Strength
Unknown	Unknown

Casualties and losses
Unknown	Unknown

The Tughlaq invasions of Bengal were Delhi Sultanate campaigns in the 14th century into the region of Orissa. The first conflict occurred in 1324 when Muhammad bin Tughlaq led a raid into Jajnagar against Bhanudeva II of the Eastern Ganga dynasty, who had supported the Kakatiyas of Warangal against Delhi Sultanate. He defeated the Orissan forces, captured booty and elephants. In 1360, Firuz Shah Tughlaq launched an expedition into Orissa, rapidly advancing through the region, defeating local forces, capturing Cuttack and reaching Puri. Bhanudeva III fled but later submitted, agreeing to pay annual elephant tribute. Firuz returned with significant spoils including elephants.

== Background ==
In 1323, Prince Ulugh Khan, later to known as Muhammad bin Tughlaq was dispatched to Telingana. He captured Bidar and then marched on Warangal. He besieged Warangal, forcing the Kakatiya ruler Prataparudra (r. 1289–1323), his family, and nobles to surrender. The raja was sent as a prisoner to Delhi. Telingana was annexed, divided into administrative districts. Warangal was renamed Sultanpur and became the provincial capital of the Delhi Sultanate. During the Warangal campaign, Bhanudeva II (r. 1306–1328) of the Eastern Ganga dynasty had supported Pratapraudra and formed alliances with the chiefs of Gondwana.

== Invasions ==
=== Muhammad bin Tughlaq's raid (1324) ===
Around the middle of 1324 AD, Ulugh Khan led expedition to Jajnagar in Orissa to chastise Bhanudeva II. He marched along the eastern coast then subdued the local naiks and captured Rajamundry. Upon reaching the frontier of Jajnagar, he encountered the forces of Bhanudeva II, who commanded a large army. A fierce battle followed, in which the Delhi troops defeated the Orissa army, plundered their camp, and seized a significant quantity of booty along with 40 or 50 war-elephants. These elephants were first taken to Telingana and later sent to Delhi. According to Isami, Sultan Ghiyath al-Din Tughluq rewarded Ulugh Khan with a robe of honour and celebrated the victory with great pomp. An inscription found at Rajamundry, dated Ramadan 724 A.H. or September 1324, records Ulugh Khan's raid in Orissa and refers to him as "Khan of the world". The Puri plates of Narasimha IV credit Bhanudeva II with a victory over 'Gayasuddina'. The inscription was issued fifty-five years after the event, which may have led to confusion in the sultan's name. Bhanudeva could have possibly fought the contemporary Ghiyasuddin Azam Shah of the Bengal Sultanate. The plates remain puzzled for modern historians.

=== Firuz Shah's invasion (1360) ===
According to an inscription Dharmalingeswar temple, Sultan of Bengal, Shamsuddin Ilyas Shah sought and received military reinforcements from Bhanudeva III (r. 1328–1378), the Ganga king of Orissa, during Firuz Shah Tughlaq's (r. 1351–1378) first invasion of Bengal in 1353–54. Although Firuz Shah won a decisive victory, he suddenly retreated to Delhi without pressing his advantage. Muslim chroniclers offered sentimental explanations for this withdrawal, but the inscription suggests the timely Orissan help enabled Iliyas Shah to resist and force the Delhi army back.

After Ilyas Shah's death in 1357, Firuz Shah, seeking revenge for his earlier failure, invaded Bengal again in 1359 against Iliyas's son Sikandar Shah. While returning from Bengal to Delhi, the Sultan reached Jaunpur, where he suddenly conceived the plan of raiding Orissa. After spending the rainy season of July–September at Jaunpur he led an expedition into Orissa in October 1360. He marched with a large cavalry force. By December 1360, he reached Bihar. From there, he marched through modern Pachet to Sikhar in the Manbhum district. The local ruler, an important chief with thirty-six vassals, fled, but his capital's garrison offered stiff resistance before being overpowered. Firuz Shah then pushed south through the defiles of Manbhum and Singhbhum, reaching Tinanagar on the frontier of Orissa. The local people resisted but were defeated. The Sultan continued to the prosperous town of Kinianagar (Khiching) in Mayurbhanj, then marched through Keonjhar to the frontier of the Cuttack. The Sultan's army captured and massacred a detachment of the Orissa army sent by Bhanudeva. The advance was so rapid that King Bhanudeva of Orissa was taken by surprise and fled from the fortress of Sarangharh five miles south-west of Cuttack. The garrison fought but was defeated. Aynul Mulk Mahru an eyewitness mentions the siege too. Bhanudeva took shelter in Chattargarh (Chatur-duar garh 20.53°N 85.92°E). Meanwhile, many officers defected to the Sultan. Bali Patra, a senior minister of Orissa, betrayed his ruler and surrendered. Another noble was Khaqan-i-Muazam Ahmad Khan, who had been expelled from Bengal by Shamsuddin Ilyas Shah and had taken shelter with the king of Orissa. He joined the Delhi forces along with his troops and followers. Firuz then advanced to the capital, Cuttack, and proceeded to city of Puri. While pursuing Bhanudeva, who had taken refuge on an island in the river, Firuz Shah spent some time hunting wild elephants. There, he demolished the temple of Jagannatha and desecrated the idols. After this, the Sultan moved to the island of Dhableswar near the seacoast likely in the region around Chilka Lake, where nearly 100,000 people of Jajnagar had taken refuge with their families. There, many were killed and captured. The campaign ended with an elephant hunt at Padamtala (in the old Baramba State). The Raja of Orissa later sent envoys offering submission and agreed to send a fixed number of elephants annually as revenue. Satisfied, Firuz sent robes and insignia. He returned obtaining seventy elephants from Lakhnauti and Jajnagar campaign.

== Aftermath ==
After Firuz Shah Tughlaq's reign, the rulers of Orissa had stopped paying their annual tribute to Delhi. In 1393–1394 AD, Sultan Malik Sarwar, the first sultan of Jaunpur, invaded Orissa, reaching up to Jajnagar. Narasimha IV (r. 1378–1425), was compelled to continue paying again.

== See also ==
- Hoshang Shah's invasion of Orissa
- Bengal Sultanate's conquest of Orissa
- Mughal conquest of Orissa
- Bahmani invasion of Orissa

== Bibliography ==
- Habib, Mohammad; Nizami, Khaliq Ahmad (1970). A Comprehensive History of India. Vol. 5, Part 2. People's Publishing House.
- Haig, W. (1928). The Cambridge History of India: Turks and Afghans, edited by W. Haig. Vol. III. Cambridge University Press.
- Majumdar, Ramesh Chandra (1960). The History and Culture of the Indian People. Vol. 6. Bharatiya Vidya Bhavan.
- Mehta, Jaswant Lal (1979). Advanced Study in The History of Medieval India (1000—1526 A.D.). New Delhi: Sterling Publishers Pvt Ltd.
- Srivastava, Ashirbadi Lal (1966). The Sultanate of Delhi, 711-1526 A.D.: Including the Arab Invasion of Sindh, Hindu Rule in Afghanistan and Causes of the Defeat of the Hindus in Early Medieval Age. Shiva Lal Agarwala.
- Haque, Mohammed Anwarul (1980). Muslim Administration in Orissa, 1568-1751 A.D. Punthi Pustak. Archived from the original on 2021-07-01.
- Hussain, Syed Ejaz (2025-10-27). Shiraz-I Hind: A History of Jaunpur Sultanate. BRILL. ISBN 978-90-04-75387-7.
- Saeed, Mian Muhammad (1972). The Sharqi Sultanate of Jaunpur: A Political & Cultural History. University of Karachi.
- Acharya, Sri P. (December 1955). "Anciet Routes in Orissa". The Orissa Historical Research Journal. IV (3&4). Bhubaneswar, Orissa: Superintendent and Museum.
