= Su. Rudramurthy Shastry =

Indian writer (born 1948

Su Rudramurthy Shastry
- Born: Sugganahalli Rudramurthy Shastry; 11 November 1948 (age 77); Sugganahalli, Bengaluru Rural district, Karnataka, India
- Occupations: Novelist, lyricist, screenwriter
- Writing career
- Genres: Fiction, history, social

Sugganahalli Rudramurthy Shastry (born 11 November 1948), is an Indian novelist, lyricist, poet and screenwriter.

Writing in the Kannada language, his works are popular in state of Karnataka, India. He has written lyrics to more than one hundred films, screenplay and dialogues for ten Kannada films, story to the 2006 biographical historical drama film Gandugali Kumara Rama, and screenplays and dialogues to many Kannada-language television serials.

== Biography ==
=== Early life and education ===
Su Rudramurthy Shastry was born at Suggenahalli, a village in the Magadi taluk, Bengaluru Rural district, about 70 km from Bengaluru. His father is S N Shivarudrayya, and mother is Siddagangamma.

His primary education was from Sugganahalli, Magadi taluk, and his high school education from Ramangara, MA (Kannada) from Bangalore University, Bengaluru.

== Works ==
He has written more than 130 books, including sixteen poetry works; more than thirty historical, fiction, social novels; and more than twenty-three story collections.

=== Collections of poems ===
- Pari
- Antaranga-Bahiranga
- Chitra Kalpane
- Naadaroopaka
- Kempana Vachanagalu
- Alpajjana Vachanagalu

=== Novels ===
- Aurangajeba
- Bannada Hakki
- Bheeshma
- Chanakya
- Chaarudatta
- Dharma Chakravarthi Ashoka
- Kanakadaasa
- Kumara Rama
- Mannina Rhuna
- Raadharajani
- Sarvajna
- Swapna Gaana

=== Other books ===
- Arabian Nights Kathegalu
- Basava Vachana Sangraha
- Kanaka Daasara Padagalu (1997), Bhagya Laksmi Publishers, Bengaluru
- Durasimhana Panchatantra, IBH Publications, Bengaluru
- Bharatada Charitre – Makkaligagi Sachitra
- Harihara Kaviya Ragale Kathegalu
- Sarvajnana Vachana Sangraha

== Works on screen ==
=== Films ===
- Gandugali Kumara Rama
- Hosamane Aliya

=== Television serials ===
- Anna Basavanna
- Venkatesha Mahime
- NaLa Damayanthi
- Vikrama and Bethala
- Maha Bharatha

== See also ==
- Kannada literature
