= Hemagudda =

Village in India

- Village
- Location within Karnataka Location within India
- Coordinates: 15°26′1″N 76°23′24″E
- Country: India
- State: Karnataka
- District: Koppal district
- Taluk: Gangavathi

Languages
  - Official: Kannada
- Time zone: UTC+5:30 (IST)
- Vehicle registration: KA 37

Hemagudda near Kammatadurga is a village in the Gangavathi taluk of Koppal district in the Indian state of Karnataka. Hemagudda is located northeast to District Headquarters Koppal. Hemagudda is 12 kilometres (7.5 mi) from Gangavathi and 20 kilometres (12.4 mi) from.

== Importance ==
Hemagudda is noted for the 14th-century Hemagudda Fort.

== See also ==
- Koppal
- Munirabad
