= Muhammad bin Tughluq (1972 film) =

- Poster
- Directed by: B. V. Prasad
- Written by: Dasari Narayana Rao (dialogues)
- Story by: Cho Ramaswamy
- Produced by: V. Jagan Mohan Rao
- Starring: Nagabhushanam
- Cinematography: Sanjeevi; Mohan
- Edited by: B. Kandaswamy
- Music by: S. Hanumantha Rao
- Production company: Chalana Chitra
- Release date: 11 February 1972
- Country: India
- Language: Telugu

Muhammad bin Tughluq is a 1972 Indian Telugu-language political satire film directed by B. V. Prasad. It is a remake of the 1971 Tamil film of the same name, which is in turn based on a 1968 play by Cho Ramaswamy. Starring Nagabhushanam in the titular role, the film was released on 11 February 1972.

== Cast ==
- Nagabhushanam as Muhammad bin Tughluq
- Krishnam Raju as Ibn Battuta
- Raavi Kondala Rao as Professor Ranganatham
- Ram Mohan
- Allu Ramalingaiah
- V. Nagayya
- Raja Babu as Ranganatham's son
- Sakshi Ranga Rao
- P. Venkateswara Rao
- Chalam
- Sandhyarani as Ranganatham's daughter
- S. P. Balasubrahmanyam as a singer (guest appearance)
- Potti Prasad
- Chalapathi Rao
- Rama Prabha
- Leelarani
- Susheela Rani
- Chhaya Devi
- Sukumari

== Soundtrack ==
The music was composed by S. Hanumantha Rao.

Track listing
No.	Title	Lyrics	Singer(s)	Length
1.	"Konte Chupula Chilakamma"	Dasarathi	S. P. Balasubrahmanyam, L. R. Eswari
2.	"Joharu Joharu Delheeswara"	C. Narayana Reddy	S. P. Balasubrahmanyam, Chorus, Vijayalakshmi Khannarao
3.	"Happy Birthday To You"	Kosaraju	S. P. Balasubrahmanyam, Chorus
4.	"Allah Allah Yemitayya Nee Leela"	C. Narayana Reddy	S. P. Balasubrahmanyam
5.	"Vayasulo Roobi Roobi Dilruba"	C. Narayana Reddy	L. R. Eswari
6.	"Nirupama Gunashali"	C. Narayana Reddy	P. Susheela

== Reception ==
A reviewer for Andhra Jyothi praised the plot, satirical dialogues, and Nagabhushanam's performance, while criticising the comedic subplots which were extraneous to the main plot. Griddaluru Gopala Rao of Zamin Ryot reviewed the film more negatively, criticising the lack of novelty in the political satire, plot holes and romantic subplots. However, he praised the performances of Nagabhushanam and Krishnam Raju.
