= Muhammad bin Tughluq (play) =

Indian political satire play

- DVD cover
- Original language: Tamil
- Written by: Cho Ramaswamy
- Characters: Muhammad bin Tughluq; Ibn Battuta; Rangachari; Thathachari
- Genre: Political satire
- Setting: Tamil Nadu, India

Premiere
- Date: 1968
- Place: Chennai

Muhammad bin Tughluq is a 1968 Indian Tamil-language political satire play written by Cho Ramaswamy. Cho also plays the titular character, portraying him and the Indian political and social affairs in a sarcastic and humorous way. The play first premiered in 1968 and opened to instant success. Thereafter, with only a few changes in 1969, the play was enacted without any changes in respect of cast, dialogues, characters, costumes, settings etc. until present day. The play ran continually for a number of performances, whose success kindled a film of the same title in 1971.

The play ran continually well into the late 2000s, after which Cho and his team could not continue, due to the former's ageing. The drama was released in DVD in Chennai and perhaps in other cities of Tamil Nadu.

== Plot ==
Thathachari comically narrates a small anecdote of Sultan Muhammad bin Tughluq, though which he emphasises how the king had an arrogant attitude, indifferent view towards his kingdom and subjects, how he ill-treated his guests and also the kind of plans he introduced that backfired. When his son Rangachari goes on a mission to research Tughluq, he finds a buried coffin which contains Tughluq, and his accomplice Ibn Battuta alive inside. They claim that they are the true Tugluq and Battuta buried several centuries ago along with a herb that has protected them and kept them alive until that day.

Tughluq gains instant fame and stays at Rangachari's house. He is interviewed by many newspaper journalists to whom he answers in a very sarcastic manner. He learns of all the changes of the past centuries, in just four days and comically remarks that the advancements of humanity, over the periods are no more than that of four days. He decides to contest elections to become the Prime Minister of India. In his political campaigns, Tughluq makes a satire of all of the politicians competing with him.

Tughluq eventually wins the elections and forms a cabinet of ministers with the announcement that anyone who joins his party will become the Deputy Prime Minister. A total of 450 people join his party and all of them are made Deputy Prime Ministers. The news of Tughluq becoming the Prime Minister with 450 Deputies, rings in everyone's radios. The Rangachari family also become very overwhelmed by it.

Tughluq shows a self-opinionated attitude towards the cabinet ministers and lends a deaf ear to all their proposals. He instead makes illogical plans to tackle the country's problems that neither make sense nor solve the problems in question. He makes foreign languages as India's National Language, makes mere promises to calm riots, legalises bribery and corruption and uses similar solutions to fix problems.

Thugluq and Battuta have a small talk in solitude. In a twist ending, it is revealed that both are actually two ordinary individuals (Mahadevan and Raghavan), who in an interest to reform the country have impersonated Thugluq and Battuta. Both being orphans faked their own death and hid themselves in a coffin in Daulatabad research site, where Prof. Rangachari would dig them out. They hoped to educate people that "only if people work hard can a good democratic government be formed". Raghavan (Battuta) now wants both of them to remove their disguise and tell the masses the truth. However, Mahadevan alias Thugluq wants to maintain their status quo and live as Prime Minister. Mahadevan, corrupt through his exposure to politics now refuses to accept that he is Mahadevan and still wants to call himself Muhammad bin Tughluq. However, Raghavan is now stubborn in revealing both their true colours.

Raghavan attempts to explain everything to the cabinet ministers and later to the masses, however, Thugluq states that his "good friend" Battuta has gone insane suddenly. At the face of no evidence to prove their identities and unquestionable evidences to the contrary, nobody believes Raghavan. They all think he is mad. Tughluq interferes with Battuta's failing speech to the masses and completely persuades all of them to support him once again. Battuta gives up his attempt to outsmart Mahadevan and instead walks away in defeat. Tughluq cleverly remarks "I know I will have your support for every move I make. And as long as you remain like this, our country will remain like this", bringing out the two-way connotation of his sentence.

== Film adaptations ==
In 1971, the play was made into a film by Cho himself, casting the same team of actors. The film was also quite successful. The plot for the film is made much more deep, well-dramatized, lengthy and adds a few more characters to stimulate interest. Notably and as opposed to the ending of the play, the film version ends more seriously, where Tughluq makes Battuta die in the hands of the people through his talk. Additionally, there is also a letter in the story, which has the proof to unveil the true identities of the Tughluq-Battuta duo, which however gets burnt later, so it does not come to light. In 1972, it was made into a Telugu film under the same title directed by B. V. Prasad and written by Dasari Narayana Rao. Nagabhushanam played the role of Tughluq.

== Home media ==
The play was released via VCD and DVD formats in May 2006 by Swathi Soft Solutions.
