= P. B. Desai =

Indian historian and archaeologist

- Born: P. B. Desai; 1910
- Died: 1974 (aged 63–64)
- Occupations: Epigraphist, historian, archaeologist

Pandurangrao Bhimrao Desai (1910–1974) was an Indian epigraphist, historian, and archaeologist.

== Early years ==
Desai was born in Gurmitkal village Gulbarga District on 24 December 1910. Panduranga was the youngest among five sons and faced some early hardships due to the loss of his father when he was still young. Coming from an economically backward area which came under the domains of the Nizam of Hyderabad, he was fortunate to get formal education in his early years. He was a polyglot, being well versed in Kannada, Marathi and Urdu, Tamil, Telugu besides English. His schooling was interrupted for a couple of years due to illness but he went on to graduation and master's degree Sanskrit.

== Curiosity in history ==
During his days as a young man, he developed an interest in collecting ancient Kannada inscriptions and epigraphs. He started his work at Kuknur, now located in Koppal district in north Karnataka. He collected over 200 Kannada inscriptions from here. In medieval times, Kuknur had been a great center of learning and many monuments built by the Rashtrakutas and Western Chalukyas are found here, including the famous navalinga temples. He also undertook the study of temple architecture, sculptures and memorial stones.

== Further studies ==
Desai restarted his education again and got a B.A. degree from Karnatak college Dharwad in 1935 and an M.A. degree from Bombay University. His first book History of Vijayanagar empire 1936 established him as a historian of repute. In his book Desai asserts that the founders of Vijayanagar Empire never belonged to the Telugu region and the story of their captivity and conversion to Islam by the Sultan of Delhi is false. He further asserts that epigraphal evidence proves that the area around Hampi was the home of the Sangama brothers, the founding kings of the empire.

== Epigraphist ==
He joined the Department of Archeology, of Government of India in 1939 and deciphered over a thousand inscriptions from Mumbai-Karnataka region as well as Tamil and Telugu inscriptions. Desai went on to become Head of Department, Ancient Indian History and Culture, Karnatak University.

== Contributions ==
As an epigraphist, his knowledge and command over several south Indian languages as well as Sanskrit made his analysis unquestionable and he made many a contribution to local journals as well as international journals like Epigraphia Indica. Some of his famous works are,

- History of Vijayanagar empire
- Corpus of Kannada inscriptions from Hyderabad
- Jainism in South India and some Jaina Inscriptions
- Basaveshvara and his times
- Shasanaparichaya
- History of Ancient India in Kannada

As an archaeologist and historian, his lasting contributions are

- Discovery of Buddhist centers in Karnataka
- Works on Shakti cult
- Panduranga of Pandharpur and history of place names

He brought out glory of Karnataka beyond the region and the country and created awareness, through several literary works. He was a prolific writer in Kannada.

Desai wrote thirty books in Kannada, ten books in English, one in Marathi and published four hundred and twenty articles in English and Kannada.
