= Muhammad bin Tughluq (1971 film) =

1971 film by Cho Ramaswamy

- DVD cover
- Directed by: Cho
- Written by: Cho
- Based on: Muhammad bin Tughluq by Cho
- Starring: Cho
- Cinematography: Vindhanji
- Edited by: R. Devarajan
- Music by: M. S. Viswanathan
- Production company: Prestige Productions
- Distributed by: Prestige Productions
- Release date: 5 March 1971
- Running time: 134 minutes
- Country: India
- Language: Tamil

Muhammad bin Tughluq is a 1971 Indian Tamil-language political satire film written and directed by Cho Ramaswamy, in his directorial debut. It is based on his play of the same name. Cho stars as the title character, with R. Neelakantan, S. Rajagopal, Veerasamy, Peeli Sivam, Manorama, Sukumari and G. Sakunthala in supporting roles. The film revolves around Tughluq, a fourteenth century sultan, waking up in 1971 and rising through the ranks in Indian politics.

Muhammad bin Tughluq was released on 5 March 1971. Though the film became controversial like the source play, it was a commercial success and became a trendsetter for socio-political satire films in Tamil cinema. The film was remade in Telugu with the same title the following year.

== Plot ==
In 1971, explorer Rangachari goes to Daulatabad to research the fourteenth century sultan Muhammad bin Tughluq, who had an arrogant attitude, indifferent view towards his kingdom and subjects, treated his guests poorly and introduced absurd plans that backfired. Rangachari unearths a coffin that contains two men alive. They claim to be Tughluq and his accomplice Ibn Battuta, buried several centuries ago along with a herb that has kept them alive all the while.

Tughluq becomes a national sensation and is welcomed in all grandeur to Rangachari's house. He is interviewed by many journalists to whom he answers in a sarcastic attitude. He learns the changes of the past centuries in almost four days and mocks that the advancements are no more than four days' advancement. He decides to contest the by-elections of North-Madras Constituency as an independent candidate to become the MP so that he can become Prime Minister (PM). Thanikachalam, an ageing freedom fighter and his daughter Gandhimathi volunteer to help organize his political rallies. In his political campaigns, Tughluq mocks all the other political contestants and in a satiric tone asks the people to vote for him.

Tughluq eventually wins the elections and become an MP. He goes to Delhi and meets with MPs from all small parties. He makes them very big offers. A total of 324/545 MPs join his party and all of them want to be made Deputy Prime Ministers (DPM), and confusion ensures. The MPs threaten to withdraw their support. Finally, Tughluq announces that all MPs who had joined his party will be made DPMs. Everyone agrees and the existing cabinet is dissolved. Tughluq is sworn in as the new PM, with the 450 MPs supporting him being made DPMs.

Tughluq appoints Gandhimathi as one of his DPMs. She initially does not understand the street-smart nature of politics and shows an innocent face to the people she meets. Tughluq shows a self-opinionated attitude to the cabinet ministers and refuses to listen to all their proposals. He instead makes plans to tackle the country's problems that neither make sense nor solve the problems in question. When there is a calamity for his decisions he makes a direct speech to the people through radio, to request peace and falsely promises to look into the problem.

Gandhimathi slowly learns all the trickery of politics and gets indulged in bribery. She rises to a pompous lifestyle from her previous poverty-ridden one, and starts taking good care of a few children in her care. On his deathbed, Thanikachalam hands Gandhimathi a letter and asks her to deliver it to Tughluq or Battuta on 31 December 1971, adding that no one else must read this letter; she agrees.

Unknown to anyone, "Tughluq" and "Battuta" are actually Thanikachalam's disciples Mahadevan and Raghavan who indulged in this charade to reform the country. They took an oath that they would publicly surrender for their charade on 31 December, hid in the coffin in Daulatabad, and began their charade soon after Rangachari unearthed them. They believed that after this incident, people would contemplate on this matter and cause a revolution that would change the state of affairs to come. However, Mahadevan suggests that they maintain the status quo and live prosperously. Corrupted through his exposure to politics, he refuses to accept that he is Mahadevan and still calls himself Tughluq. Raghavan, however, is now stubborn on revealing their true colours.

Raghavan approaches Gandhimathi to get Thanikachalam's letter, which is a written confession of the details of the trio's plan signed by Mahadevan himself and posted to Thanikachalam. It is the only proof of Tughluq's true identity. Gandhimathi, now equally corrupt herself and for the sake of the children she takes care of, refuses to hand over the letter because she would get into trouble for supporting Mahadevan and Raghavan, and burns it. Raghavan attempts to explain everything to the cabinet ministers and later to the masses; however, "Tughluq" lies that "Battuta" has gone insane and asks everyone not to believe him. He further tricks the masses, through his words, into killing Raghavan, with whom dies their secret.

== Cast ==
- Cho as Muhammad bin Tughluq/Mahadevan
- R. Neelakantan as Thathachari
- S. Rajagopal (Ambi) as Rangachari
- Veerasamy as Thanikachalam
- Peeli Sivam as Ibn Battuta/Raghavan
- Manorama as Gandhimathi
- Sukumari as Srimathi
- G. Sakunthala as Mangalam

== Production ==
Muhammad bin Tughluq, a play written by Cho and first staged in 1968, became a success despite becoming controversial for targeting the Dravida Munnetra Kazhagam (DMK) founder M. Karunanidhi and the then Prime Minister of India, Indira Gandhi. After this, in 1971, Cho announced that the play would be adapted into a film. Soon after, the DMK tried to hinder the film's production in every possible manner, including protests. Many actors were warned against accepting to work in the film, but Cho cast members of his troupe. Manorama's character was based on Indira Gandhi, including her bob cut. Cinematography was performed by Vindhanji, and editing by R. Devarajan. Throughout the course of production, the film was threatened by the protests which had gained momentum, but Cho refused to compromise.

== Soundtrack ==
The music was composed by M. S. Viswanathan, and the lyrics were written by Vaali. The song "Allah, Allah" is set in the Carnatic raga known as Sindhu Bhairavi, and praises Allah through the lyrics "Allah Allah, nee illaadha idame illai, nee thaane ulagin ellai" (Allah! Allah! There is no place without You, You are the ultimate in affection). Cho included the song to counter the DMK's attempts to say the film was promoting Islamophobia. Viswanathan initially wanted Nagore E. M. Hanifa to sing the song, but since Hanifa had previously sung many DMK propaganda songs and was a friend of Karunanidhi, "getting him to sing for this film was out of the question". The producers later considered Mohammed Rafi, who could not accept due to scheduling conflicts. At Cho's insistence, Viswanathan himself sang it.

Track listing
| No. | Title | Lyrics | Singer(s) | Length |
|---|---|---|---|---|
| 1. | "Allah, Allah" | Vaali | M. S. Viswanathan |
| 2. | "Party Dance" (Instrumental) | — | — |
| 3. | "Pallandu Pallandu" | Vaali | S. P. Balasubrahmanyam, L. R. Eswari, Saibaba, Veeramani, Radha |
| 4. | "Paavalan Paadiya" | Vaali | T. M. Soundararajan |

== Release and reception ==
Muhammad bin Tughluq was released on 5 March 1971, and distributed by Prestige Productions. It was previously scheduled for 25 February. In a review dated 21 March 1971, Ananda Vikatan described Muhammad bin Tughluq as testimony for Cho's wisdom to make a film teasing the Indian politics with intelligence combined with comedy, maturity and clarity of thought, without hurting others. Though the film became controversial, it was a commercial success.

== Legacy ==
Muhammad bin Tughluq attained cult status in Tamil cinema, and became a trendsetter for socio-political satire films which provoked the public, including Kaliyuga Kannan (1974), Rudra Thandavam (1978) and Amaidhipadai (1994). The film was remade in Telugu with the same title in 1972. The term "Tughluq" entered Tamil vernacular, with it meaning someone who reverses his own decision without proper reason. Film historian Mohan Raman said in 2016 that the film is relevant "even four decades after its release – not just due to the humour, but also with respect to the content. It is relevant even in today's electoral politics". A play by T. V. Varadarajan named Thuglak Durbar, inspired by both the play and film versions of Muhammad bin Tughluq, was staged in 2019. Director Arun Vaidyanathan cited Muhammad bin Tughluq as an influence for his 2014 film Peruchazhi, and K. R. Prabhu for his 2019 film LKG.

== Bibliography ==
- Dhananjayan, G. (2011). The Best of Tamil Cinema, 1931 to 2010: 1931–1976. Galatta Media. OCLC 918246209.
- Goble, Alan, ed. (2011). The Complete Index to Literary Sources in Film. De Gruyter. ISBN 978-1-85739-229-6.
- Rajadhyaksha, Ashish; Willemen, Paul (1998) [1994]. Encyclopaedia of Indian Cinema. British Film Institute and Oxford University Press. ISBN 0-19-563579-5.
- Ramanujam, K. S. (1971). Challenge and Response: An Intimate Report of Tamil Nadu Politics, 1967–1971. Sundara Prachuralayam. OCLC 482334.
- Sundararaman (2007) [2005]. Raga Chintamani: A Guide to Carnatic Ragas Through Tamil Film Music (2nd ed.). Pichhamal Chintamani. OCLC 295034757.
