= Kampili kingdom =

14th century Hindu kingdom in South India

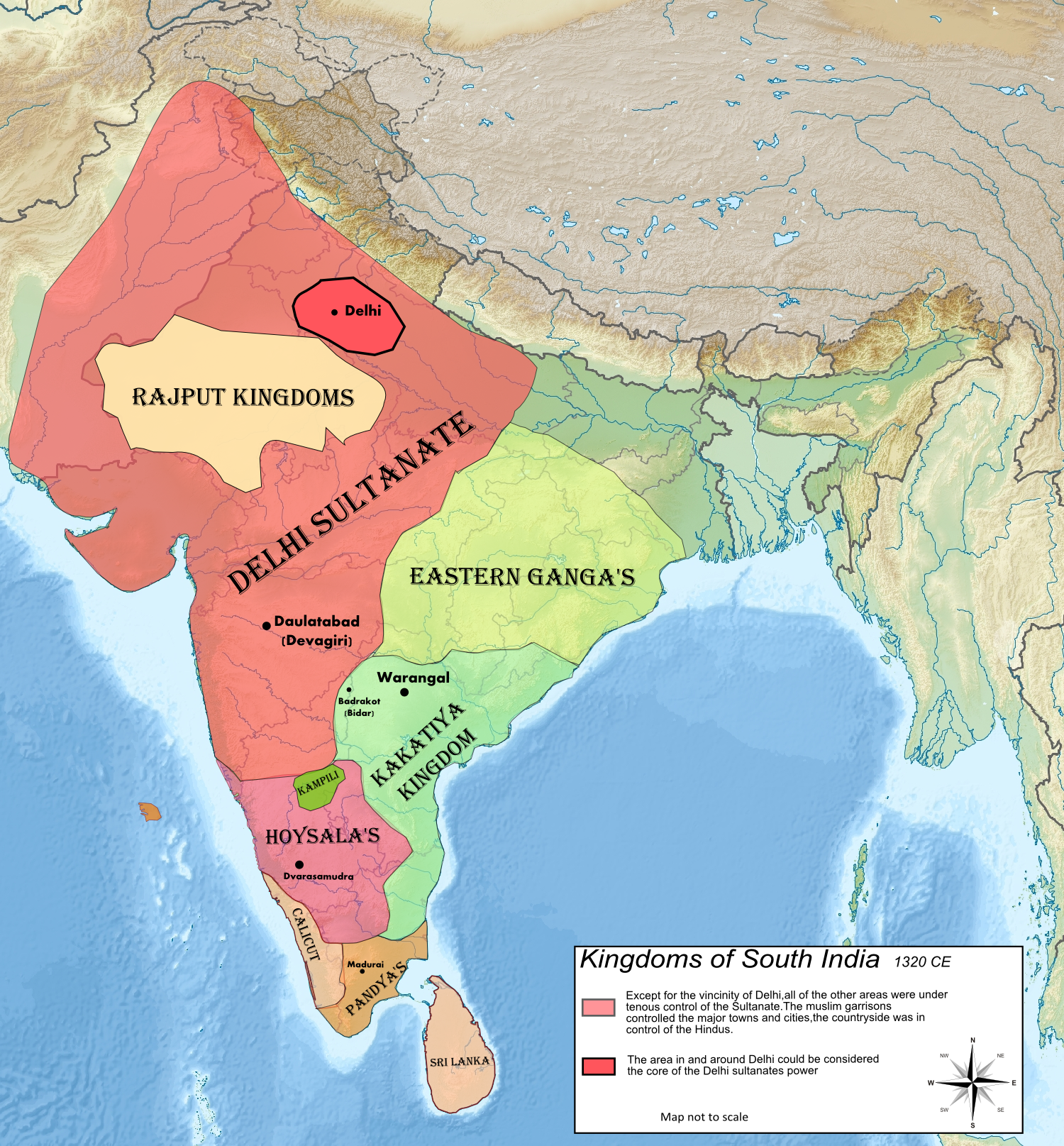
The map of the Indian subcontinent in 1320 CE, with Kampili kingdom shown in the southern parts of Karnataka.

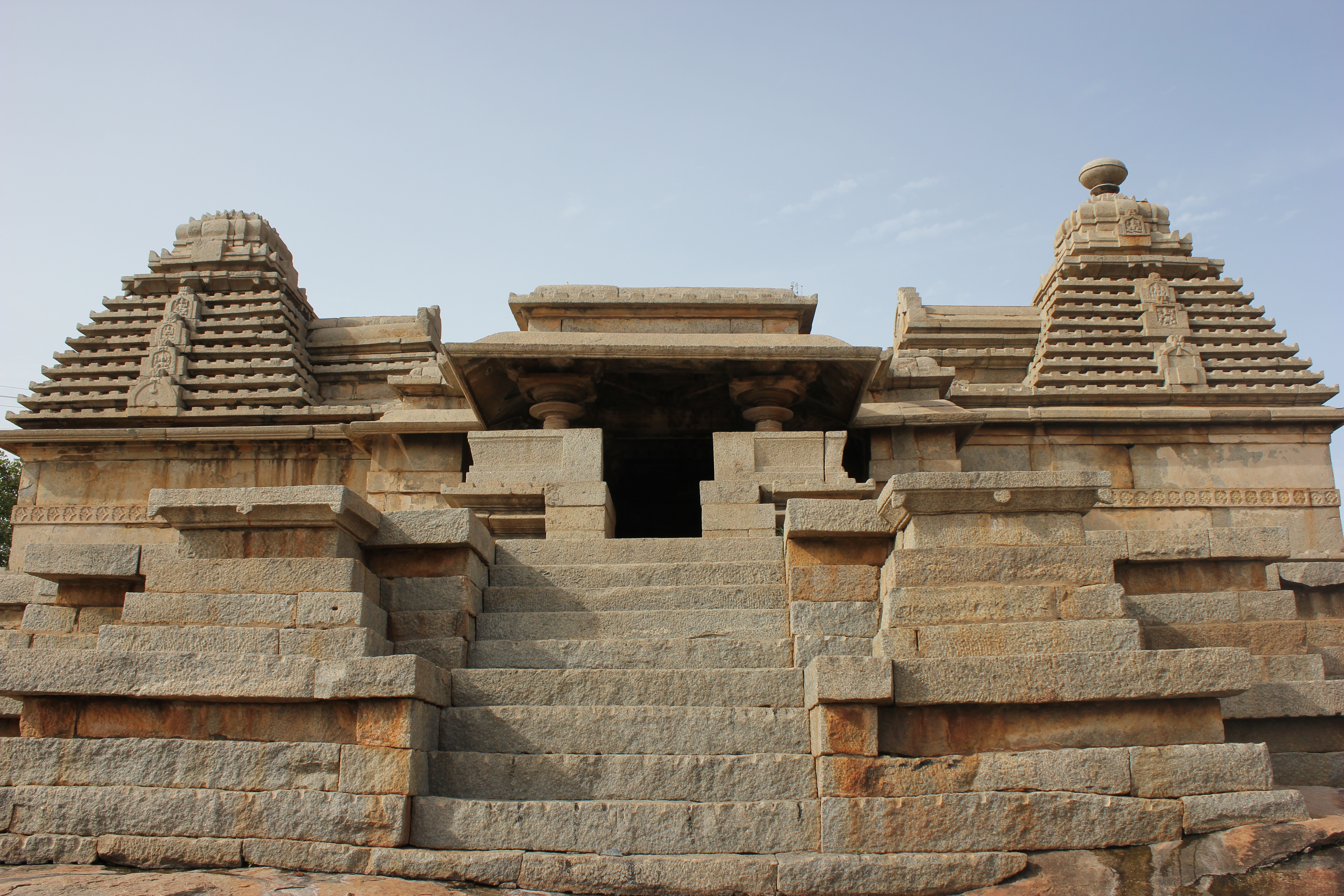
A Shiva temple on Hemakuta hill in Hampi was built by Kampilideva, the last king of the Kampili Kingdom.

The Kampili kingdom was a short-lived Hindu kingdom in the 14th century CE in South India. The kingdom existed near Ballari in the Tungabhadra river in the northeastern parts of the present-day Karnataka state, India. It was destroyed after a defeat by the armies of the Tughlaq dynasty and a Jauhar (mass war suicide by immolation) in 1327 CE when it faced a defeat. The Kampili kingdom in some historical accounts is called the Basnaga kingdom, and it is the kingdom which inspired and ultimately led to the Hindu Vijayanagara Empire.

== History ==
The founder of the kingdom was a Hoysala commander, Singeya Nayaka-III (1280 CE–1300 CE), who declared independence after the Turkish forces of the Dehli Sultanate was killed by the Seuna Yadavas of Devagiri in their territories in 1294 CE. Nayaka-III was succeeded by his son Kampilideva in 1300 CE, who remained in dispute with the territorial claims of the Delhi Sultanate's forces. The Kampili kingdom then fell to the invasion in 1327 CE from the north by the forces of Muhammad bin Tughluq, the Tughlaq king of Delhi. The army led by Malik Zada sent the news of its victory over Kampili kingdom to Muhammad bin Tughluq in Delhi by sending the straw-stuffed beheaded head and body of the dead Hindu king Kampilideva. The Vijayanagara Empire emerged in 1336 CE from the remains of this kingdom and it ruled over South India for 310 years.

== Gallery ==
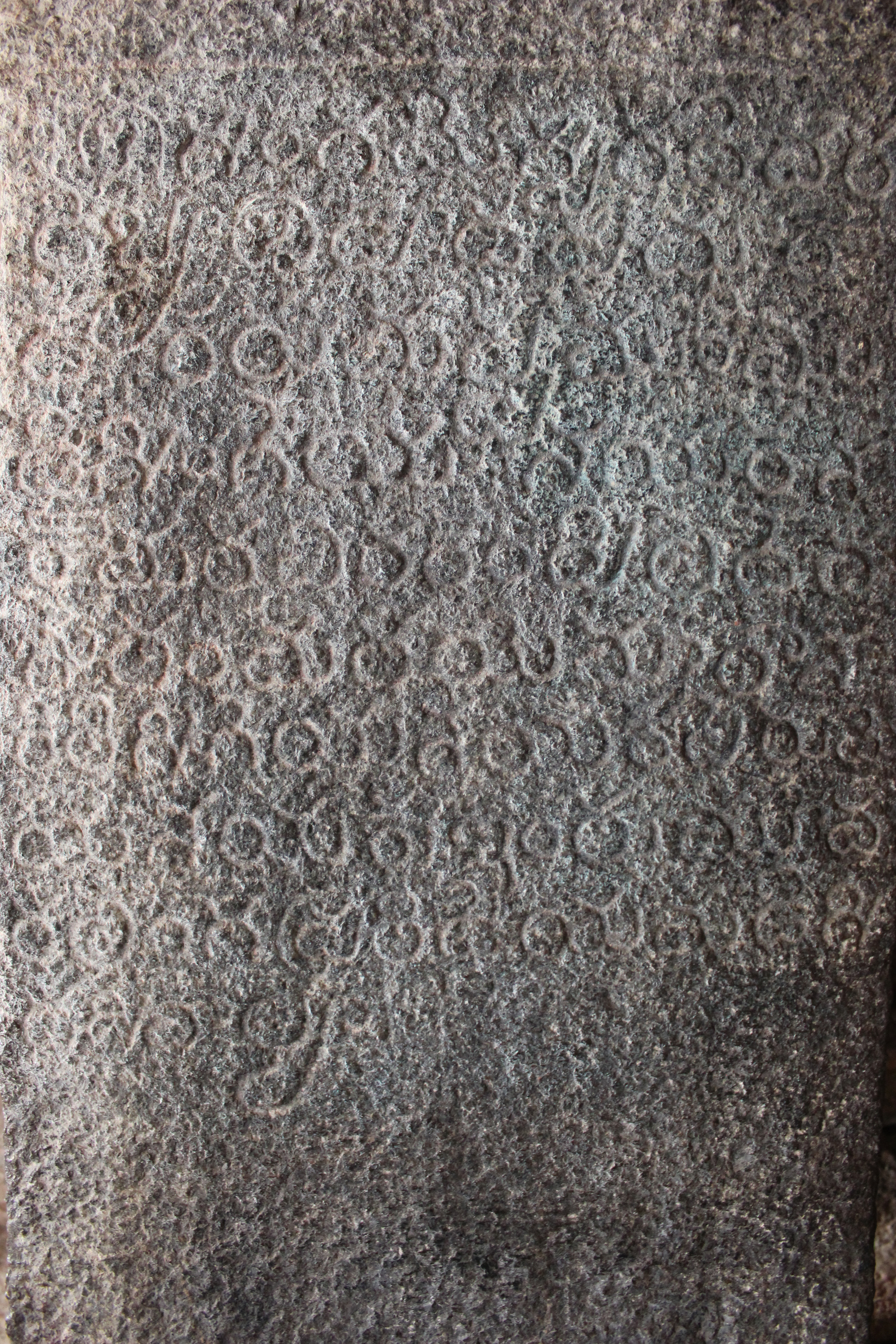
Old Kannada inscription (1326 CE) of Kampilideva, the Raja of the Kampili Kingdom, in mandapa of a Shiva temple built by him on Hemakuta hill in Hampi.

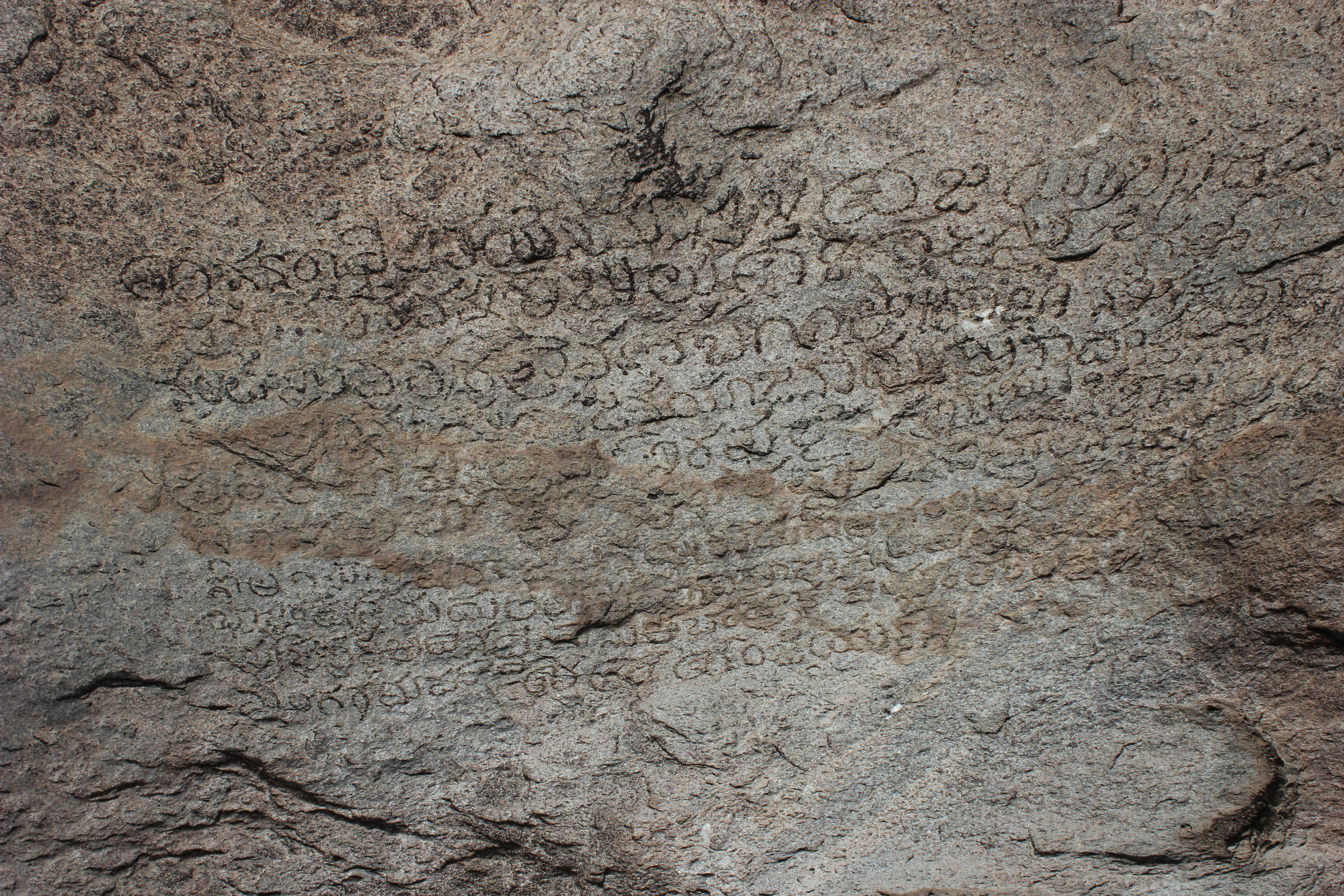
Old Kannada inscription (1326 CE) of Kampilideva, the Raja of the Kampili Kingdom, on a rock face of the Hemakuta hill in Hampi.

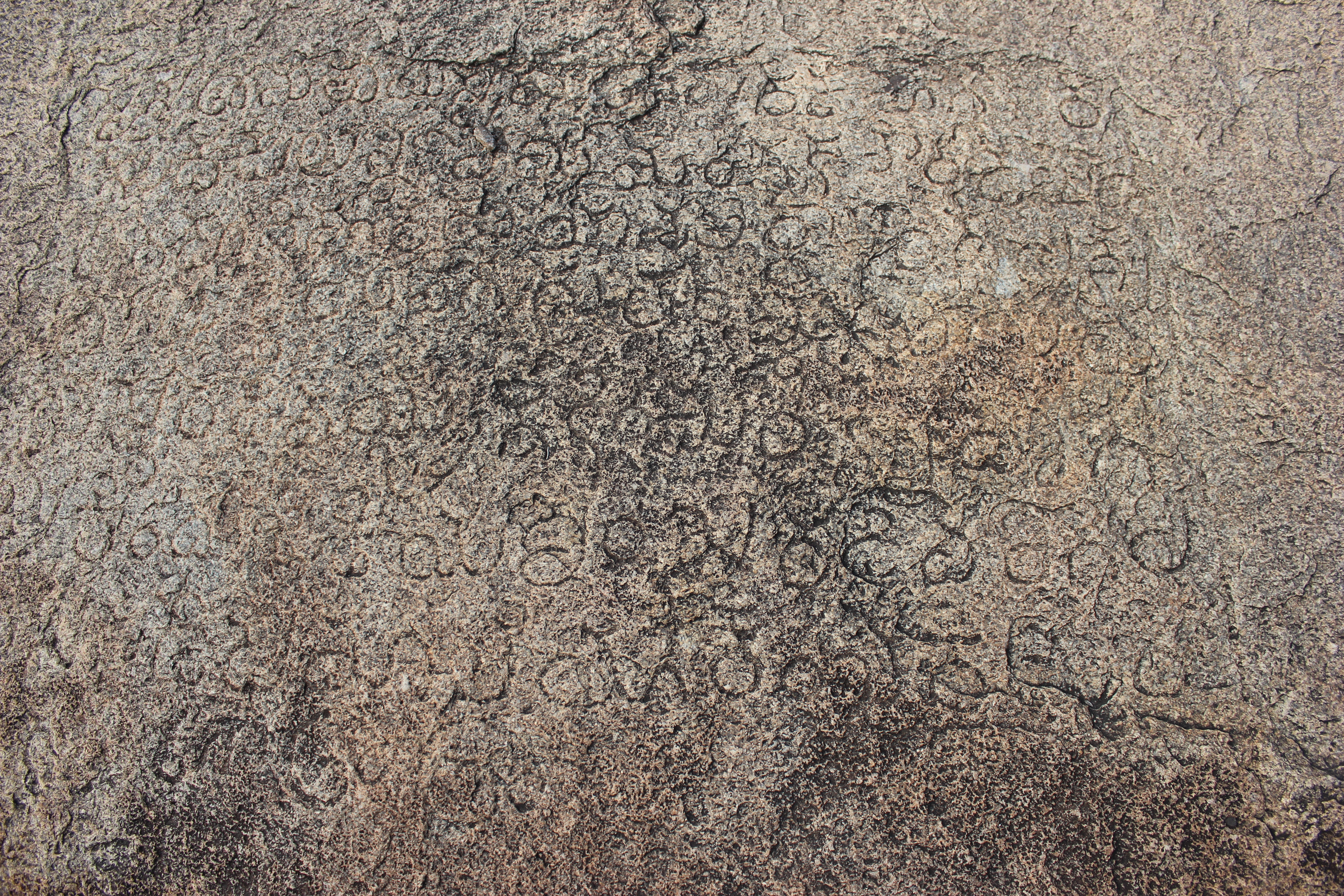
Old Kannada inscription dated 1309 CE, of Kampilideva, the Raja of the Kampili Kingdom, on a rock face of the Hemakuta hill in Hampi.

== See also ==
- Kammata Durga, the capital of the Kampili kingdom
- Kampilideva, the last Kampili king, the father of Kumara Rama
- Kumara Rama, a Kampili prince
