= Anuja Chandramouli =

Indian writer

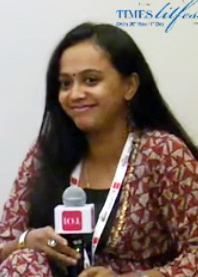
- Anuja Chandramouli, Times Lit Fest, 2019
- Born: 1984 (age 41–42)
- Citizenship: India
- Education: Women’s Christian College Chennai
- Children: 2
- Writing career
- Genres: Fantasy; Historical fiction
- Notable work: Arjuna: Saga of a Pandava Warrior Prince (2012)

Anuja Chandramouli (born 1984) is an Indian author of fantasy and historical fiction.

== Education and career ==
Chandramouli has a bachelor's degree in psychology from Women's Christian College Chennai and a master's degree in English.

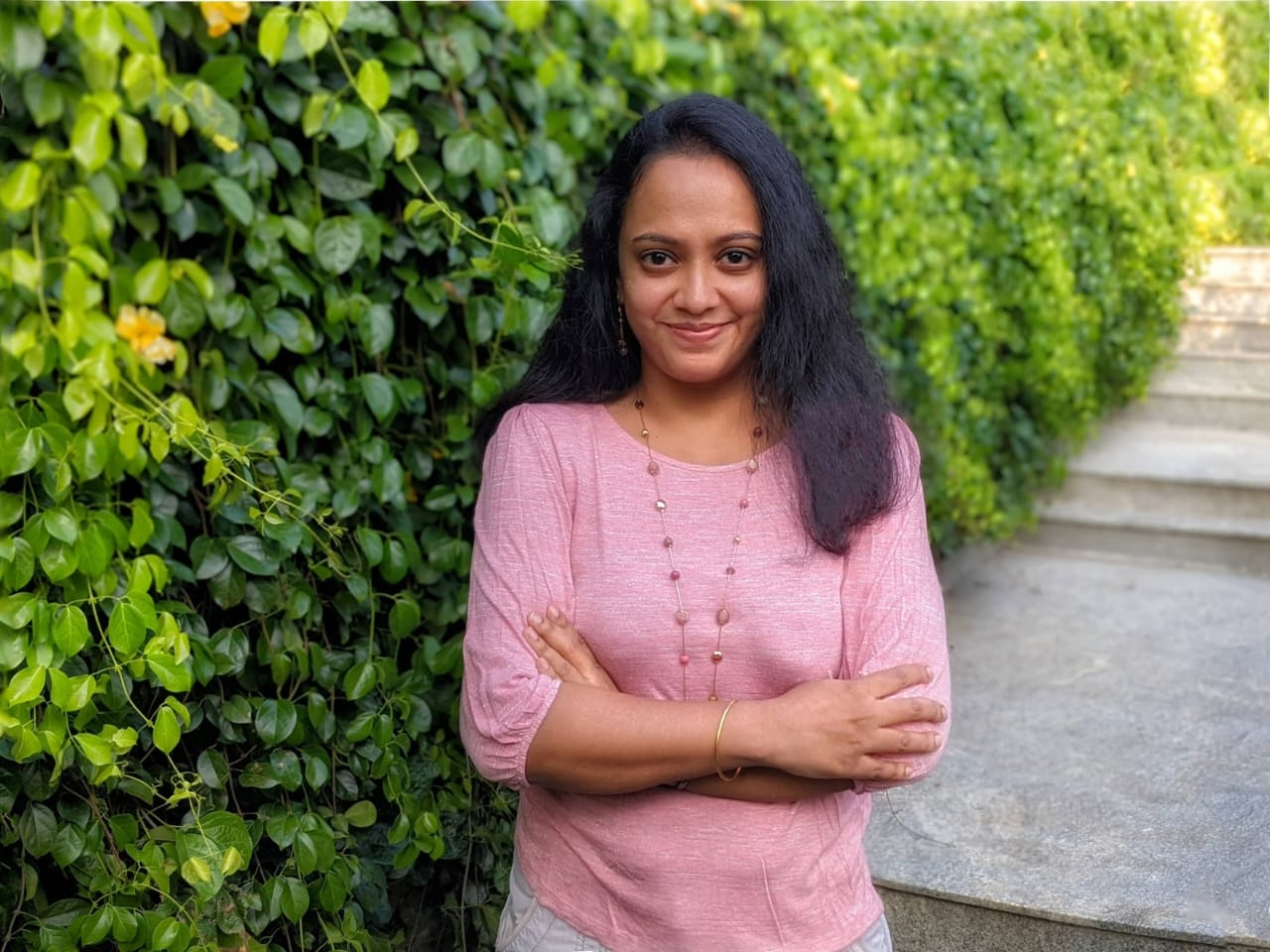
Author Anuja Chandrmouli Profile

She is the author of seven novels. Her debut Arjuna: Saga of a Pandava Warrior Prince was published in 2012. Her 2017 novel, The Burning Queen, is about Rani Padmavati, a 13th–14th century Indian queen. Ganga: The Constant Goddess was published in 2018. Mohini: The Enchantress was published in August 2020, followed by Abhimanyu: Son of Arjuna in 2022.

== Personal life ==
Chandramouli is married and has two daughters.
