= Kumara Rama =

Historical figure in the Indian state of Karnataka

Kumara Rama (1290 – 1320) is revered as a historical figure in the Indian state of Karnataka and the inspiration for the establishment of the Vijayanagar Empire. Kumara Rama was the son of the chief Kampli Raya of Kampli or Kampli Kote (Kampli Fort). Kampli is a town in Bellary district of Karnataka and headquarters of Kampli.

== As a Prince ==
Kumara Rama (1290–1320), was an ideal prince and an embodiment of good virtues, who stood by his father in waging relentless wars against the Kakatiya dynasty of Warangal, Hoysala, and Muhammad bin Tughlaq of northern India. Kumara Rama died at a very young age while battling the Muslim armies.

== Worship in his name ==
Several tribes in Karnataka worship Kumara Rama, in whose honour many medieval temples were built. There is a temple located in Mensi village in Siddapur Taluk of Uttara Kannada district. Every year, surrounding villagers worship Kumara Rama on an auspicious day by keeping his masks. A temple has been built in Koratagere, Tumkur.

== Personal life ==
Kumara Rama fell in love with an aboriginal girl who later becomes his father's wife due to unusual circumstances. Though Rama took this development as a fall out of destiny, the woman did not reconcile to her fate and tried to seduce Rama. But Rama stood out for morals and was humiliated by her. Then he became the victim of her tricks and Kampila Raja ordered his execution. But his look-alike brother Chenniga Rama sacrifices his life for him and Kumara Rama wages wars against the invasion of Tughlaq's army. He dies in the battle and his dignity is restored in death.

== Movie ==
A Kannada movie was made in honour of the exploits of Kumara Rama called as Gandugali Kumara Rama. Shivaraj Kumar, the popular Kannada actor portrayed the role of Kumara Rama. The same role was earlier portrayed by Vishnuvardhan in a play sequence of the 1978 movie Madhura Sangama.

== See also ==
- Kampli
- Kummata Durga
- Origin of Vijayanagara Empire
