= Kammata Durga =

Village in India

Kammata Durga Kammatadurga
- Village
- Location within Karnataka Location within India
- Coordinates: 15°24′28″N 76°22′30″E
- Country: India
- State: Karnataka
- District: Koppal district
- Taluk: Koppal

Government
  - Body: Gram panchayat

Languages
  - Official: Kannada
- Time zone: UTC+5:30 (IST)
- ISO 3166 code: IN-KA
- Vehicle registration: KA 37
- Website: karnataka.gov.in

Kammata Durga, also spelled as Kammatadurga,(near Hemagudda) is a village in the Koppal taluk of Koppal district in the Indian state of Karnataka. Kammatadurga is located Northeast to District Headquarters Koppal.

== Importance ==
Kammatadurga was the capital of King Kampila father of Kumara Rama who is known to fight and defeat several invasions of both Malik kafur of Alauddin Khilji empire and tughlaq army of Muhammad ibn tughlaq and undefeated until his last war at age 27 . Kammatadurga is famous for the ancient Kammatadurga fort also called as Kumara Rama Kote located on the hill top.

== See also ==
- Hemagudda
- Koppal
- Munirabad
