= Muhammad bin Tughluq =

Sultan of Delhi from 1325 to 1351

- Fakhr al-Malik; Abu al-Mujahid
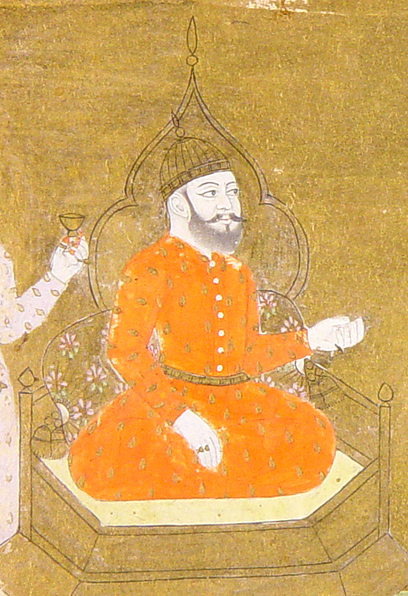
- Early Mughal painting of Muhammad bin Tughluq (1534)

18th Sultan of Delhi Tughluq Emperor
- Reign: 4 February 1325 – 20 March 1351
- Coronation: 4 February 1325; Tughlaqabad Fort
- Predecessor: Ghiyath al-Din Tughluq
- Successor: Firuz Shah Tughlaq
- Vizier: Khwaja-i-Jahan Ahmad Ayaz
- Born: Malik Fakhr-ud-Din Jauna Khan c. 1290; Delhi, Delhi Sultanate (modern-day New Delhi, India)
- Died: 20 March 1351 (aged 60–61); Sonda, Sindh Sultanate (modern-day Sindh, Pakistan)
- Burial: Tughlaqabad, Delhi
Regnal name
- Al-Sultān al-Ā'dil Fakhr al-Dunyā wa'l-Dīn Abu'l-Mujāhid Muhammad bin Tug͟hluq Shāh
- Dynasty: Tughlaq
- Father: Ghiyasuddin-Din Tughluq
- Mother: Makhduma-i-Jahan
- Religion: Sunni Islam
- Tughra

Fakhr-ud-Din Muhammad Shah (Persian: فخر الدین محمد شاہ), better known as Muhammad bin Tughluq (Persian: محمد بن تغلق; Persian pronunciation: [mu.ham.ˈmad bin tuɣ.ˈlaq]; 1290 – 20 March 1351), or Muhammad II, also known by his epithets, The Eccentric Prince, and The Mad Sultan, was the eighteenth Sultan of Delhi. He reigned from February 1325 until his death in March 1351. Muhammad was the eldest son of Ghiyath al-Din Tughluq, founder of the Tughlaq dynasty. In 1321, the young Muhammad was sent by his father to the Deccan Plateau to fight a military campaign against the Kakatiya dynasty. In 1323, the future sultan successfully laid siege upon the Kakatiya capital in Warangal. This victory over King Prataparudra ended the Kakatiya dynasty.

Named Jauna Khan as Crown Prince, Muhammad ascended the throne of Delhi upon his father's death in 1325. Muhammad bin Tughluq had an interest in medicine. He was also skilled in several languages: Persian, Hindavi, Arabic, Sanskrit and Turkic. Ibn Battuta, the famous traveler and jurist from Morocco, wrote in his book about his time at the Sultan's court. Exhibiting traits of paranoid personality disorder, Muhammad was nicknamed the Wisest Fool by later historians (such as Stanley Lane-Poole).

== Early life ==
Fakhr ud-Din Jauna Khan was born to Ghiyasuddin-Din Tughluq, who founded the Tughlaq dynasty after taking control of the Delhi Sultanate. He is also known as Prince Fakhr Malik Jauna Khan, Juna Khan or Ulugh Khan. Jauna Khan remarked that he was "bound to all Indians by ties of blood and relation."

== Ascension ==
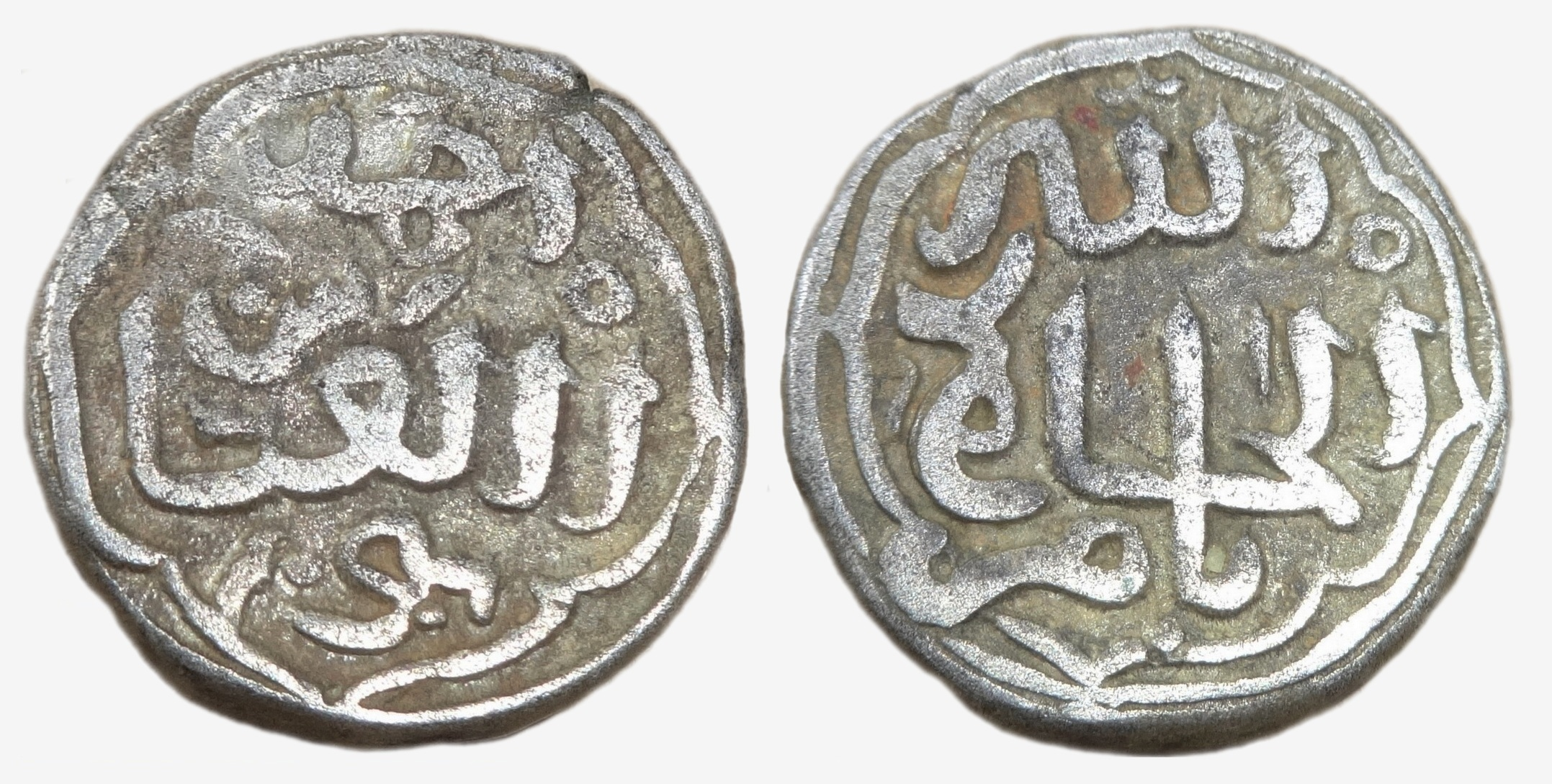
Billon Tanka of Muhammad bin Tughlaq

Three days after the death of his father Ghiyasuddin-Din Tughlaq, Muhammad bin Tughlaq ascended the throne of Tughlaq dynasty of Delhi on 4 February 1325. In his reign, he conquered Warangal (in present-day Telangana, India), Ma'abar (Kayalpatnam) and Madurai (Tamil Nadu, India), and areas up to the modern day southern tip of the Indian state of Karnataka. In the conquered territories, Tughluq created a new set of revenue officials to assess the financial aspects of the area. Their accounts helped the audit in the office of the wazir. His full title was Al-Sultān al-Ā'dil al-Abd al-Rāji Rahmat Allāh al-Wāthiq Bi-ta'yīd al-Rahmān al-Mujāhid fī-Sabīl Allāh Abu'l-Mujāhid Fakhr al-Dunyā wa'l-Dīn Muhammad bin Tug͟hluq Shāh al-Sultān. (Note: السلطان العادل العبد الراجی رحمت اللہ الواثق بتأييد الرحمن مجاہد فی‌سبیل‌الله ابو المجاہد فخرالدنیا والدین محمد بن تغلق شاه السلطان (lit. 'The Just Sultan, the Servant Hopeful of the Mercy of Allah, Relying on the Support of the Most Gracious, the Warrior in the Cause of Allah, the Father of the Warrior, Glory of the World and the Faith, Muhammad, Son of Tughluq Shah, the Sultan.'))

Muhammad bin Tughluq was also known for his tolerance for other religions. Several historians mention that the Sultan honored the Jain monk Jinaprabha Suri during the year 1328. Peter Jackson mentions that Muhammad was the only Sultan who participated in Hindu festivities.

== Moving of the capital ==
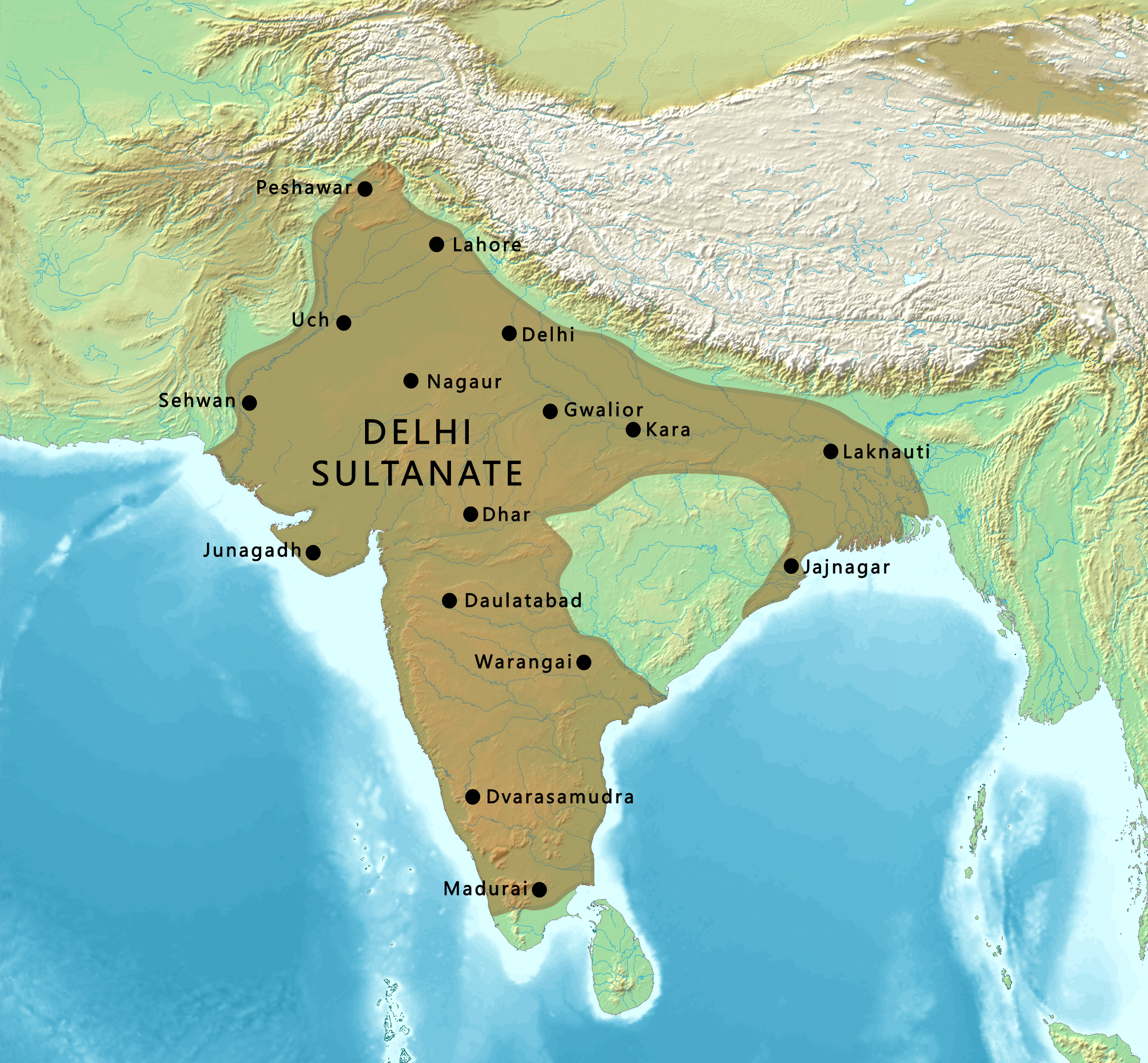
Map of the Delhi Sultanate under Muhammad bin Tughlaq

In 1327, Tughluq ordered to move his capital from Delhi to Daulatabad (also known as Devagiri) (in present-day Maharashtra) in the Deccan region of India. Muhammad bin Tughlaq himself had spent a number of years as a prince on campaign in the southern states during the reign of his father. Daulatabad was also situated at a central place so the administration of both the north and the south could be possible. These elite colonists from Delhi were Urdu-speakers, who carried the Urdu language to the Deccan. These immigrants included Hasan Gangu, a celebrated general who would later found the Bahmanid Empire.

A broad road was constructed for convenience. Shady trees were planted on both sides of the road; he set up halting stations at an interval of two miles. Provisions for food and water were also made available at the stations but most of the people died during the shifting as the ruler was not able to provide them with enough food and water for their survival. Tughluq established a khanqah at each of the stations where at least one sufi saint was stationed. A regular postal service was established between Delhi and Daulatabad. In 1329, his mother also went to Daulatabad, accompanied by the nobles. By around the same year, Tughluq summoned all the slaves, nobles, servants, ulema, sufis to the new capital. The new capital was divided into wards called mohalla with separate quarters for different people like soldiers, poets, judges, and nobles. Grants were also given by Tughluq to the immigrants. Even though the citizens migrated, they showed dissent. According to Ibn Batuta's accounts, the reason for the transfer of capital was that Tughluq shifted the capital for protection from Mongol and Afghan Invasion which was later confirmed by Historian Garner Brown. In the process, many died on the road due to hunger and exhaustion as there were not enough resources. Moreover, coins minted in Daulatabad around 1333, showed that Daulatabad was "the second capital".

In 1334, there was a rebellion in Mabar, led by the North Indian Muslim soldier, Jalaluddin Ahsan Khan Kaithali, a native of Kaithal in North India, who founded the Madurai Sultanate. While on his way to suppress the rebellion, there was an outbreak of bubonic plague at Bidar due to which Tughluq himself became ill, and many of his soldiers died. While he retreated back to Daulatabad, Mabar and Dwarsamudra broke away from Tughluq's control. This was followed by a revolt in Bengal. Fearing that the sultanate's northern borders were exposed to attacks, in 1335, he decided to shift the capital back to Delhi, forcing the citizens to return to their previous city. This caused many more deaths.

=== Impact ===
While most of the Medieval historians, including Barani and Ibn Battuta, tend to have implied that Delhi was entirely emptied (as is famously mentioned by Barani that not a dog or cat was left), it is generally believed that this is an exaggeration. Such exaggerated accounts simply imply that Delhi suffered a downfall in its stature and trade. Besides, it is believed that only the powerful and nobility suffered hardships if any. Two Sanskrit inscriptions dated 1327 and 1328 C.E. confirm this view and establish the prosperity of the Hindus of Delhi and its vicinity at that time.

Although this decision was unpopular among the Muslim elite, one impact of this decision was that Islamic rule in Deccan lasted centuries longer than Delhi's own unstable authority over the south. If not for Tughlaq's creation of a Muslim elite at Daulatabad, there would have been no stable Muslim power like the Bahmani Sultanate to check the rising power of the Hindu Vijayanagara Empire.

== Expeditions ==
After the death of Genghis Khan, one line of his descendants, the Chagatai Khanate, ruled over Turkistan and Transoxiana and another branch of Hulagu Khan conquered present day Iran and Iraq. (Note: The term Khurasan refers to a historical area in Central Asia which included the mentioned regions.) However, at the time of Tughlaq, both of the dynasties were on the downfall, with conditions in Transoxiana unstable after the death of Tarmashirin. He was ambitious of annexing these kingdoms. He invited nobles and leaders from these regions and gave them grants. At that time many Afghan rulers gained independence and posed a significant threat to the Tughluq empire.

Tughluq raised an army of possibly up to 370,000 soldiers in 1329. Barani has written that Tughluq took no step to check the ability of the soldiers or the brand of horses. They were paid in one year advance, and after being kept idle for one year, Tughluq found it difficult to pay them. Therefore, he decided to disperse and dissolve the soldiers in 1329.

In 1330, he annexed Munger to his empire from Bengal. In 1333, Muhammad Bin Tughlaq led the Qarachil expedition to the kumaon region of modern-day Uttrakhand in India. Historians like Badauni and Ferishta wrote that Tughluq originally wanted to cross the Himalayas and invade China. However, he faced local resistance in Kumaon. Dharam Chand is Pahari Rajput (including garhwal and some part of himachal) defeated the army of Muhammad Bin Tughlaq which was not able to fight in the hills. Nearly all his 100,000 soldiers perished and were forced to retreat. Under his reign Chittagong and Tipperah was occupied.

== Death and ensuing collapse of the empire ==
Muhammad Bin Tughlaq died in 1351 on his way to Thatta, Sindh, while he was campaigning in Sindh against the Taghi, a Turkic slave tribe. It was during his reign that the Sultanate of Delhi collapsed under two attacks. One was from Rajputs led by Hammir Singh of Mewar, while the other was from Harihara and Bukka of South India. While Rana Hammir Singh liberated the strategic Rajputana following the victory in Battle of Singoli in 1336, Harihara and Bukka established a new empire called Vijayanagara Empire, by initially defeating and later ending the Madurai Sultanate that was ruling the city of Madurai and its environs of South India on behalf of the Delhi Sultanate. Several other south Indian rulers like Musunuri Kaapaaneedu, etc. also contributed to the downfall of the Islamic Sultanate of Delhi. To add to Tughluq's woes, his own generals rebelled against him. One of his generals, an Afghan or Turk Muslim named Hasan Gangu, would go on to form the Bahmani Sultanate in the Deccan during the Rebellion of Ismail Mukh.

== Token currency ==
Muhammad-bin-Tughluq orders his brass coins to pass for silver, 1330 CE

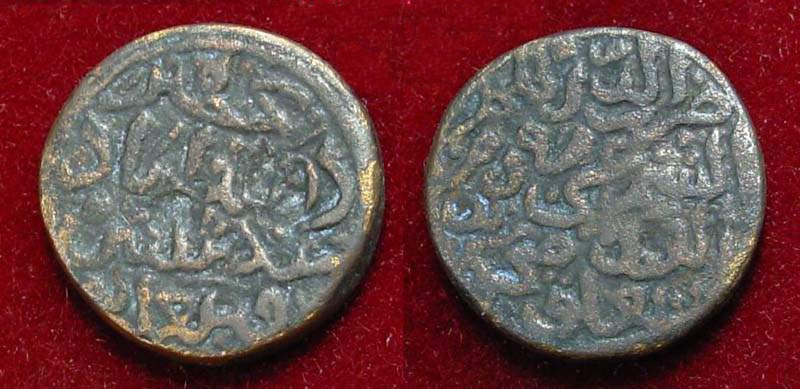
Forced token currency coin

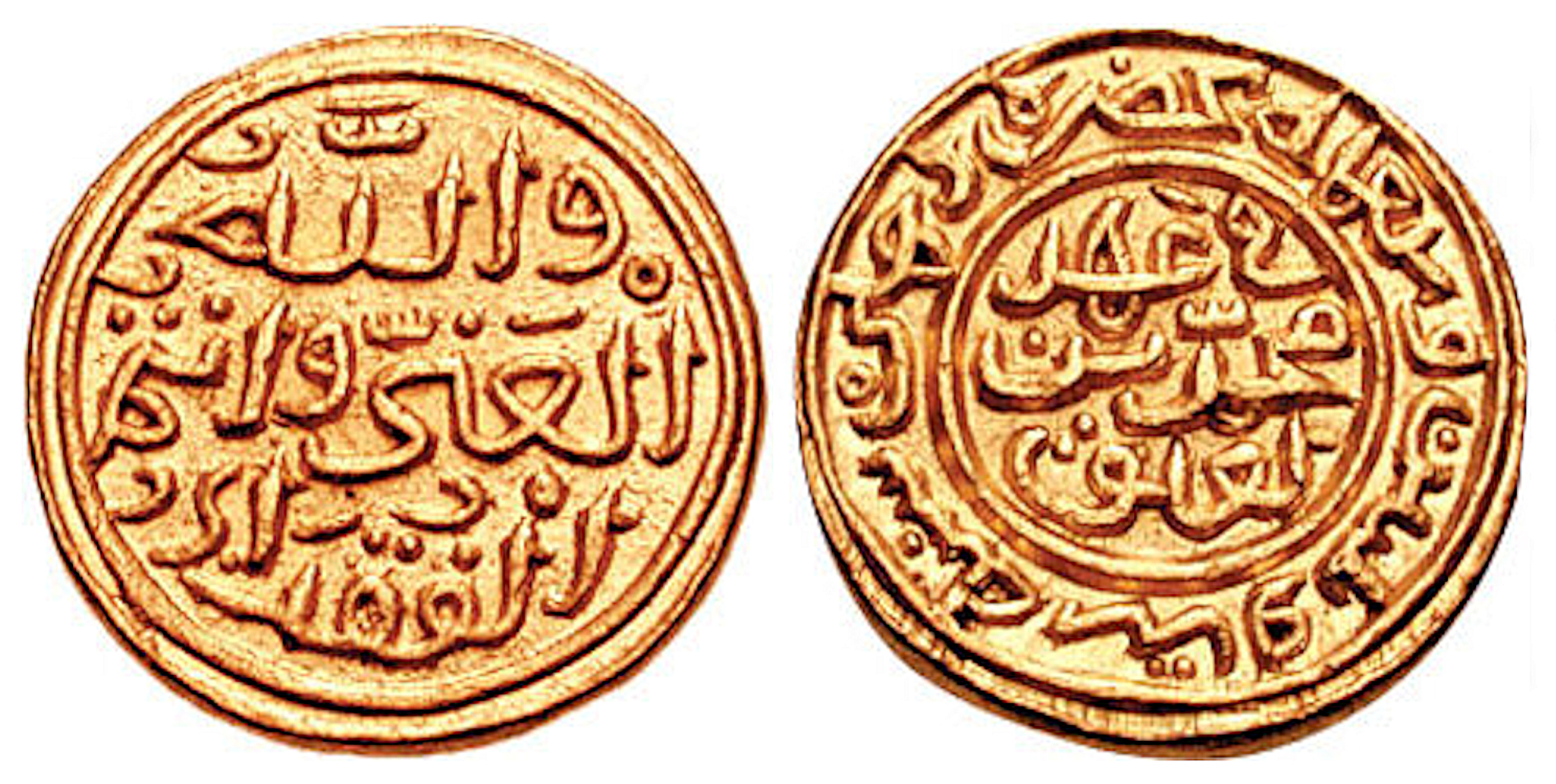
Gold coin of Ibn Tughluq in c. 1325–1351

Historian Ishwari Prasad writes that different coins of different shapes and sizes were produced by his mints which lacked the artistic perfection of design and finish. In 1330, after his failed expedition to Deogiri, he issued token currency; that is coins of brass and copper known as jital and tanka were minted whose value was equal to that of gold and silver coins. Historian Ziauddin Barani felt that this step was taken by Tughluq as he wanted to annex all the inhabited areas of the world for which a treasury was required to pay the army. Barani had also written that the sultan's treasury had been exhausted by his action of giving rewards and gifts in gold. In the rural areas, officials like the muqaddams paid the revenue in brass and copper coins and also used the same coins to purchase arms and horses. As a result, the value of coins decreased, and, in the words of Satish Chandra, the coins became "as worthless as stones". This also disrupted trade and commerce. The token currency had inscriptions in Persian and Arabic marking the use of new coins instead of the royal seal and so the citizens could not distinguish between the official and the forged coins. Records show that the use of token currency had stopped by 1333 as Ibn Battuta who came to Delhi in 1334, wrote a journal which made no mention of this currency.

== Failure of token currency ==
During the reign of Muhammad bin Tughlaq (1325–1351 CE), he introduced a bold but disastrous economic experiment — the issue of token currency made of brass and copper, which were to circulate at the same value as silver coins. His idea was inspired by the Chinese practice of using token coins.

However, the plan failed badly. Since there was no strict system to control minting due to a lack of a government coin making machine, people started making counterfeit coins at home using brass and copper. Soon, the market was flooded with fake coins, and the value of the new currency collapsed. Foreign traders and common people refused to accept them, and chaos spread throughout the empire.

The contemporary historian Ziauddin Barani, in his famous chronicle Tarikh-i-Firuz Shahi, wrote about this failure in detail. He criticized Muhammad bin Tughlaq for his impractical and hasty experiments, saying that although the Sultan was intelligent and ambitious, his policies often failed because they were poorly executed and ahead of their time.

== Religious policy ==
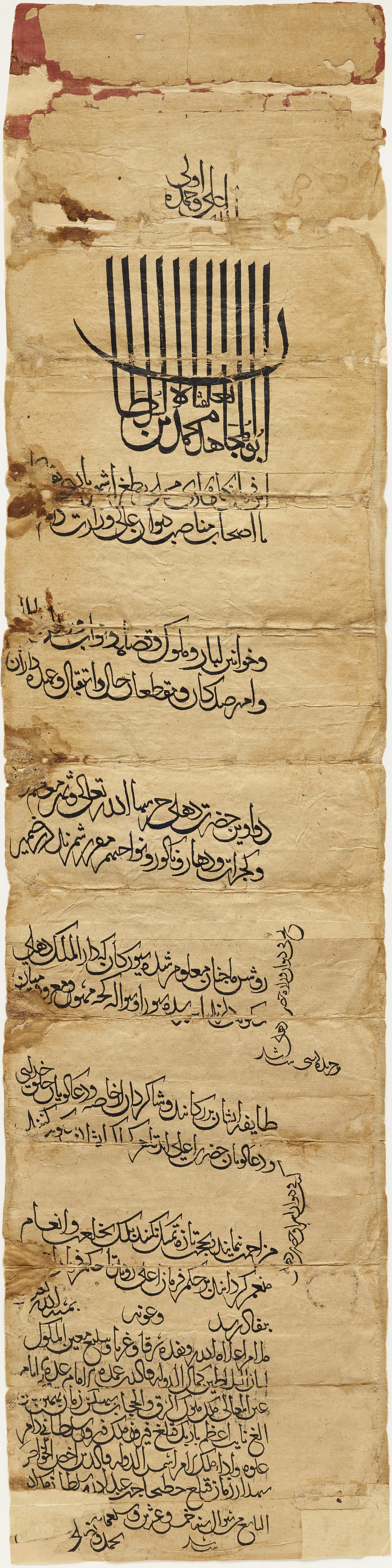
Firman of Muhammad bin Tughluq dated Shawwal 725 AH/September–October 1325. At the very top is an invocation to God, below which is the large tughra with the ruler's name and titles. Keir Collection

There are conflicting views expressed by historians on his religious tolerance. While visitors Ibn Battuta, Nunez and Firishta mention that Muhammed Bin Tughlaq showed intolerance to other religions, on the contrary, Peter Jackson mentions that Muhammed was the only Sultan who participated in Hindu festivities. Ibn Battuta mentions that the king of China (the Yuan Emperor) had sent an embassy to Muhammad for reconstruction of a sacked temple at Sambhal. The envoys were however denied with the statement that only those living in a Muslim territory who paid the jizya could be permitted to restore a temple. Firuz Shah Tughlaq had claimed that before his rule, idol-temples had been permitted to be rebuilt contrary to the Sharia.

The contemporaneous Jain authorities attests Muhammad's cordial relations with the Jains and further showing favour to the Jain scholars.

== Personality ==
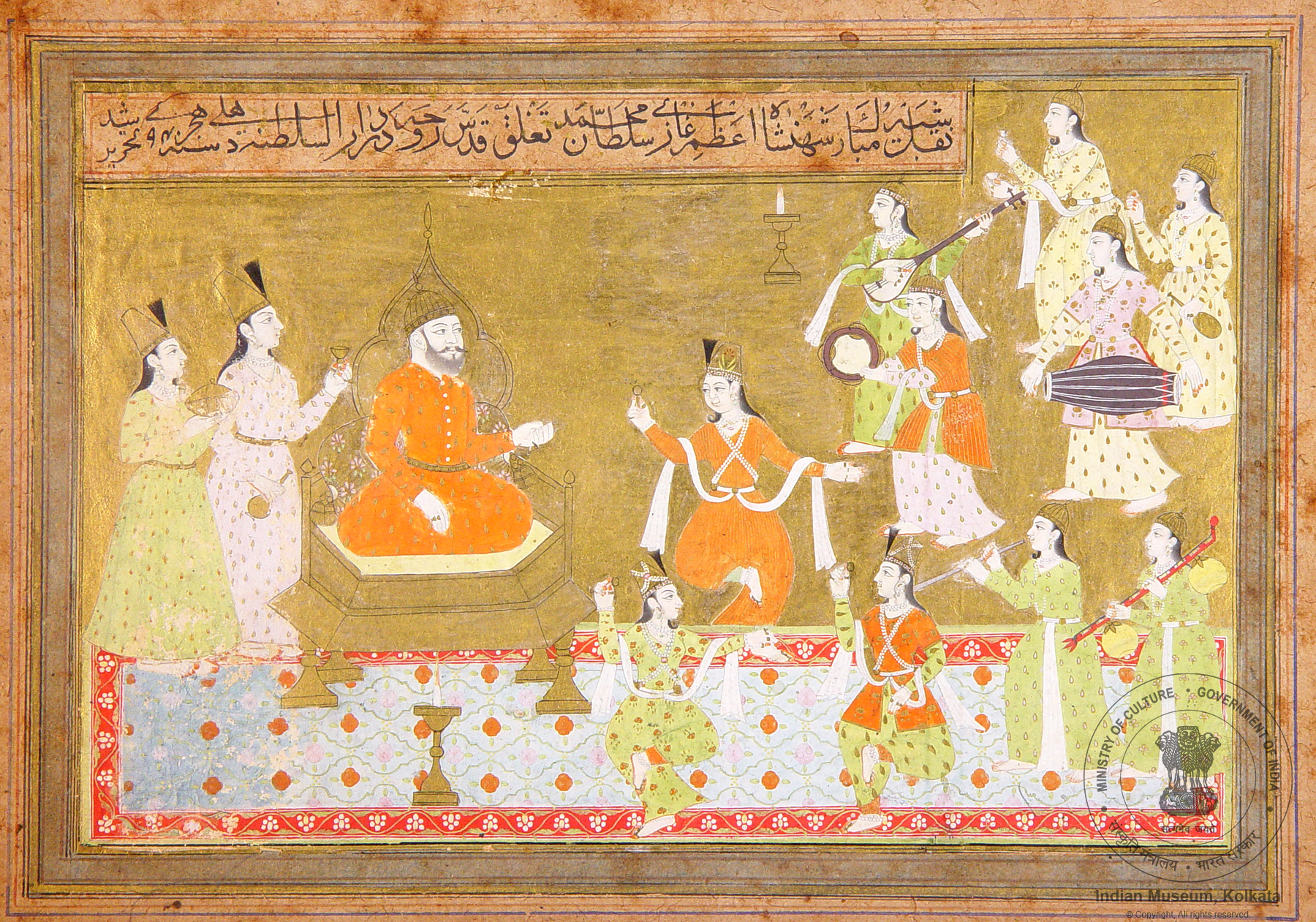
Muhammad bin Tughlaq on the throne - Indian Museum, Kolkata (1534).

Tughluq was a strict Muslim, maintaining his five prayers during a day, and used to fast on Ramadan. According to 19th century CE British historian Stanley Lane-Poole, apparently courtesans had hailed Tughluq as a "man of knowledge" and had an interest in subjects like philosophy, medicine, mathematics, religion, Persian and Urdu/Hindustani poetry. In his "Medieval India", "He was perfect in the humanities of his day, a keen student of Persian poetry ... a master of style, supremely eloquent in an age of rhetoric, a philosopher trained in Logic and Greek metaphysics, with whom scholars feared to argue, a mathematician and lover of science." Barani has written that Tughluq wanted the traditions of the nubuwwah to be followed in his kingdom. Even though he did not believe in mysticism, Chandra states that he respected the Sufi saints, which is evident from the fact of his building of the mausoleum of the saint Nizamuddin Auliya at Nizamuddin Dargah. Critics have called him hasty in nature, owing to most of his experiments failing due to lack of preparation. Ibn Battuta has also written that he depended on his own judgment and rarely took advice from others and has also criticized him for his giving of excessive gifts and "harsh punishments". He was famous because whenever a gift was bestowed upon him, he would give gifts worth three times the value to show his stature.

== In popular culture ==
- A Tughlaqi Firman is a term regularly used in the Politics of the Indian Sub-continent. It is generally used to criticize laws, acts or orders passed by the local, State or National Government of the day by comparing it to a Royal diktat.
- Tughlaq, a Kannada play about his life was written by Indian writer Girish Karnad in 1968.
- Muhammad bin Tughluq is a 1968 Indian Tamil-language political satire play written by Cho Ramaswamy (who also played the titular role).
- Muhammad bin Tughluq (1971) is an Indian satirical film in Tamil based on the play by Ramaswamy.
- Mohammad Bin Tuglaq, an Indian Telugu-language film by B. V. Prasad released in 1972. It was a remake of the Tamil film.
- Thuglak is an Indian weekly news magazine published in Tamil. It was started by Cho Ramaswamy in 1970 and was named after the emperor (who also serves as its mascot).
- Doordarshan presented an episode with Muhammad bin Tughluq as a character in its series, Upanishad Ganga.
- Tughlaq is a term still used in contemporary times to tease someone when they do something illogical or counter-intuitive.
- Indian historical fiction author Anuja Chandramouli wrote Muhammad Bin Tughlaq: Tale of a Tyrant on Tughlaq which was published by Penguin Random House.

== Bibliography ==
- Blair, Sheila (2008). Islamic Calligraphy. Edinburgh University Press. ISBN 978-0748612123.
- Elliot, H. M. (Henry Miers), Sir; John Dowson (1867). "15. Táríkh-i Fíroz Sháhí, of Ziauddin Barani". The History of India, as Told by Its Own Historians. The Muhammadan Period (Vol 3.). London : Trübner & Co.
- Chandra, Satish (2004). Medieval India: From Sultanat to the Mughals-Delhi Sultanat (1206–1526) – Part One. Har-Anand Publications. ISBN 9788124110645.
- Ahmed, Farooqui Salma (2011). A Comprehensive History of Medieval India: Twelfth to the Mid-Eighteenth Century. Pearson Education India. ISBN 9788131732021.

Preceded by Ghiyath al-Din Tughluq	Sultan of Delhi; 1325–1351	Succeeded by Firuz Shah Tughluq
