= Malik Maqbul Tilangani =

Vizier of Delhi Sultanate (d. 1369)

Malik Maqbul
- Died: 1369
- Resting place: Tomb of Khan-i Jahan Tilangani
- Known for: Tughlaq military leader; Wazir of the Delhi Sultanate

Malik Maqbul (Mala Yugandharudu), also referred to as Khan-i-Jahan Maqbul Tilangani and Jahan Khan (d. 1369), was an Indian commander in the Kakatiya Empire who was converted to Islam and rose to become the Wazir of the Delhi Sultanate under Firuz Shah Tughlaq (r. 1351–1388). He was appointed as the governor of Hyderabad in service of the Delhi Sultanate and he ruled and governed all the lands of present day Telangana on behalf of the Delhi Sultanate.

== Career in Warangal ==
Malik Maqbul or Mala Yugandharudu (also called Gannama Nayaka), was a commander of the Kakatiya Empire under Prataparudra (r. 1289–1323). Marana's Markandeya Puranamu (in Telugu) names him as "Pedda Mala Devudu" & "Gannavibhudu" and describes him as the commander (Kataka paludu) of Warangal Fort, the capital of Kakatiyas. The term "Mala Devudu" (meaning "Lord") implies that he was very high up in the Kakatiya administrative hierarchy.

After Ghiyasuddin Tughluq's son and general Ulugh Khan (Muhammad bin Tughluq) captured Warangal in 1323, Ulugh Khan himself took over the Governorship of what is now a new province of "Teling" (Telangana) in the Sultanate. Gannaya was captured and converted to Islam, given the name Malik Maqbul and found a place in the new regime. When Ulugh Khan left for Delhi soon afterwards, he left Warangal in the charge of Malik Maqbul. Ulugh Khan succeeded Ghiyasuddin Tughlaq as the new Sultan of Delhi under the name Muhammad bin Tughluq.

The new regime was beset with rebellions and the Muslim governors were not welcomed as rulers. The coastal region around Rajahmundry slipped out immediately after Ulugh Khan's departure, the area south of Krishna River in 1325, Bhadrachalam area in 1330 and western Telangana between 1330–1335. The Sultan marched on South India in 1334 in order to suppress the rebellions, but his army was struck by an epidemic, and he was forced to return to Delhi. Soon afterwards, captured Warangal, and Malik Maqbul fled to Delhi. Facing significant losses in his army due to the epidemic, the Sultan was in no position to recover Telangana.

== Career in Delhi ==
Malik Maqbul was initially made the governor of Multan and sent to administer Punjab. When he was the governor of Cambay, the Moroccan traveller Ibn Battuta met him who was on his journey towards south of India.

After his return to Delhi, Maqbul earned the trust of Muhammad bin Tughluq. He accompanied the sultan on an expedition to Gujarat to subdue the rebels in Broach. He put all the rebels to death and captured enormous amount of wealth. Subsequently, by making himself indispensable in the Delhi durbar (court), he became the finance minister and finally, the Wazir, of the Delhi Sultanate under Firuz Shah Tughlaq. When Firuz Shah was away on a Campaign to Sindh and Gujarat for six months and no news was available about his whereabouts Maqbul ably protected Delhi. He was the most highly favoured among the significant number of the nobles in Feroz Shah's court and retained the trust of the sultan. Feroz Shah used to call Maqbul as 'brother'. The sultan even remarked that Khan-i-Jahan was the real ruler of Delhi. The fiscal and general administration were entirely left to Maqbul. On his part, Maqbul never exceeded his powers, and kept the sultan fully informed. He was also scrupulously honest. Although he did take presents from the governors of the provinces, he entered them in the royal treasury. He was also strict in collecting government dues. His powers, however, were restricted by the auditor (mustaufi) and by the Accountant-General (mushrif). Sometimes it led to bitter disputes in which the sultan mediated. On one occasion, Maqbul threatened to leave for Mecca when he came into conflict with Ain-i-Mahru, the Accountant General. Sultan had to retrench Ain-i-Mahru. Maqbul was paid annually 13 lakh tankas over and above the expenses of his army and servants and separate allowances for his sons and sons-in-law. Maqbul also maintained a retinue of 2000 concubines.

=== Successor ===
Firoz Shah gave an undertaking that the position of Wazir will be inherited by Maqbul's son. After the death of Maqbul in 1369 CE, his son Jauna Khan became the Wazir.

Jauna Khan was as competent as his father but he was no military leader. He failed in the conflict for succession, which began even during the lifetime of Feroz Shah. Jauna Khan was captured and executed. Also known as Junan Shah, he built seven large mosques in and around Delhi including Khirki Masjid and Kalan Masjid.

== Monuments ==
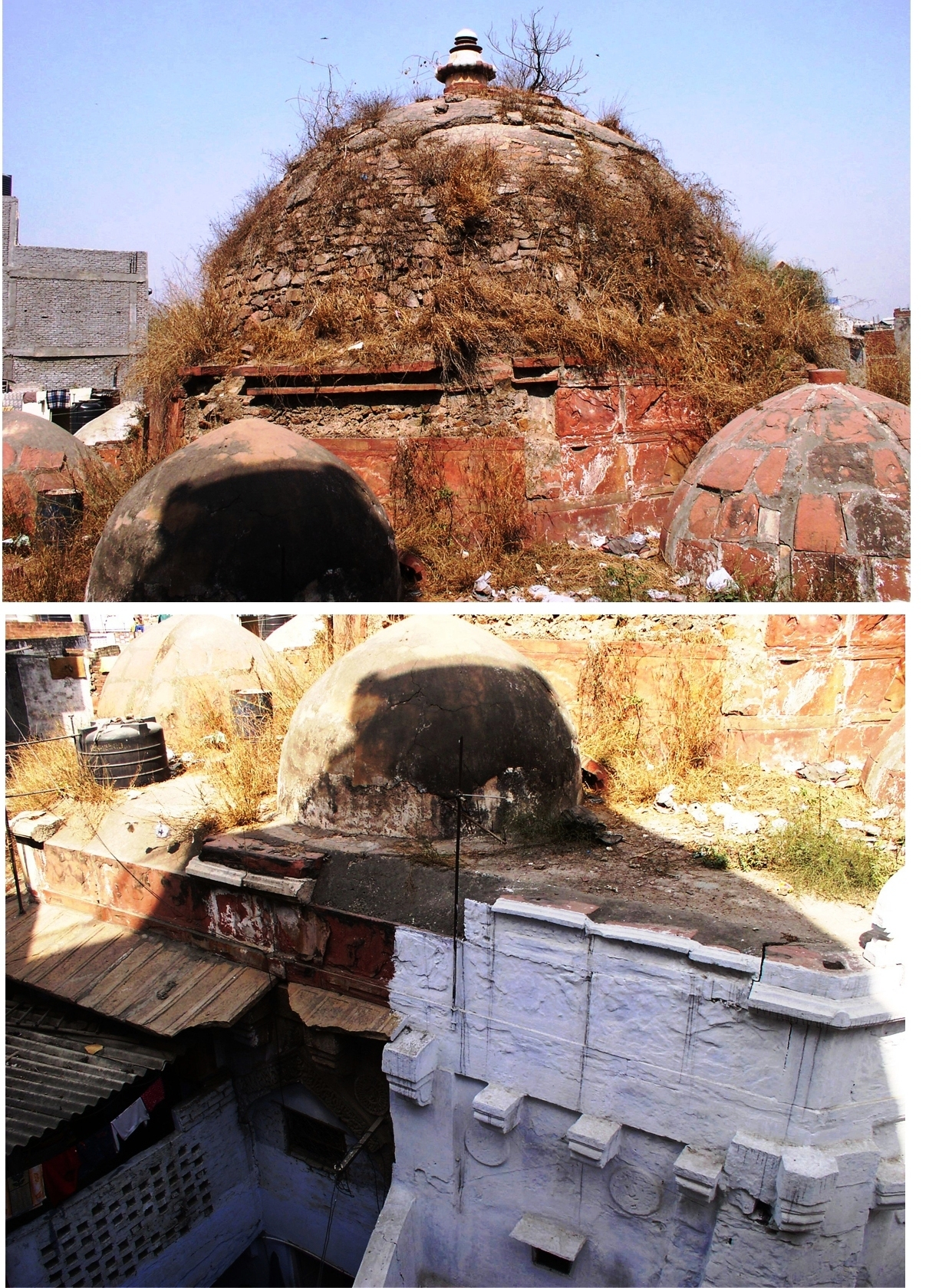
Malik Maqbul's tomb in Delhi

Built in 1388 by Junan Shah (son of Malik Maqbul), his tomb was the first octagonal mausoleum to be built in Delhi. The only other octagonal mausoleum that pre-dates this tomb in the Indian subcontinent is the Tomb of Shah Rukn-i Alam in Multan. The mausoleum occupies the northwestern corner of Nizamuddin West. The plan is composed of an octagonal burial chamber wrapped by a larger octagonal veranda. The verandah has three arched openings on each side, with a finial bearing cupola crowning the central arches. A large raised dome sits on top of the central chamber. While the parapet wall of the veranda is articulated with crenellations, a slanting stone overhang (chhajja) runs beneath it, encasing all sides of the structure. The main entry to the structure is through the central arch of its south façade. The walls of the chamber are substantially thick. The mihrab is set in a stepped niche on the west wall of the chamber. A stairwell leading to the crypt below is also built into the western wall and accessed from inside a doorway. A large rectangular sarcophagus sits centred in the chamber beneath the dome in a two tiered arrangement. The tomb stands today in a very poor state of repair.

== Bibliography ==
- Jackson, Peter (1999), The Delhi Sultanate: A Political and Military History, Cambridge University Press, ISBN 978-0-521-54329-3
- Rama Rao, M. (1947), "The Fall of Warangal and After", Proceedings of the Indian History Congress, 10: 292–297, JSTOR 44137150
- Somasekhara Sarma, Mallampalli (1945), A Forgotten Chapter of Andhra History: History of the Musunūri Nāyaks, Andhra University/Ananda Press
- Wagoner, Phillip B.; Rice, John Henry (2001), "From Delhi to the Deccan: Newly Discovered Tughluq Monuments at Warangal-Sult̤ānpurand the Beginnings of Indo-Islamic Architecture in Southern India", Artibus Asiae, 61 (1): 77–117, doi:10.2307/3249963, JSTOR 3249963
