= Rudrama Devi =

Queen regnant of the Kakatiya Kingdom from 1262 to 1289

- Raya-gaja-kesari
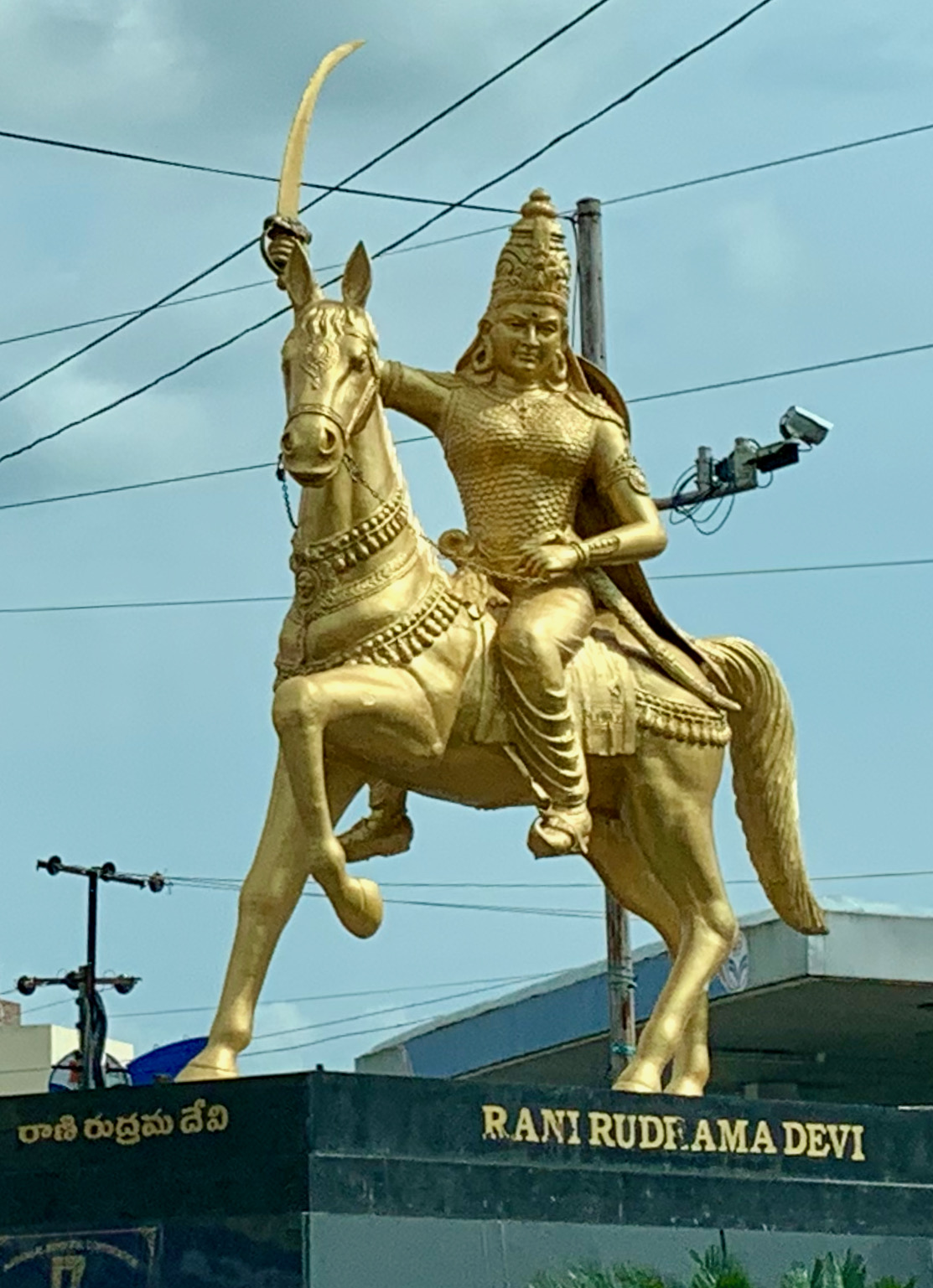
- Statue of Rudrama Devi in Warangal Fort

Kakatiya Ruler
- Reign: 1262 – November 1289
- Predecessor: Ganapati-deva
- Successor: Prataparudra
- Died: November 1289; Possibly at Chandupatla (present-day Telangana, India)
- Spouse: Virabhadra
Regnal name
- Rudra Deva Maharaja
- Dynasty: Kakatiya
- Father: Ganapati-deva

Rudrama Devi (reigned 1262–November 1289), also known by her regnal name Rudra-deva Maharaja, was a Kakatiya Queen regnant who ruled substantial parts of present-day Telangana and Andhra Pradesh in southern India.

Rudrama's father and predecessor Ganapati, who had no son, appointed her as his co-regent around 1260. By 1263, Rudrama became the sole ruler, although she was not formally anointed as a sovereign at least until 1269. Early during her reign, Rudrama appears to have faced a revolt, which she was able to suppress with the support of her loyalists. She recovered some of the territories that the Kakatiyas had lost during the late 1250s and the early 1260s to their southern neighbours - the Pandyas. She also repulsed invasions by the Seunas (Yadavas) from the north-west, and the Gajapatis from the north-east. In the 1270s and the 1280s, Rudrama lost much of her southern territory to a revolt by the Kayastha chief Amba-deva, and likely lost her life in a conflict against him in 1289. Her grandson Prataparudra succeeded her on the Kakatiya throne.

The reign of Rudrama was remarkable for the rise of several non-aristocratic warriors in the Kakatiya service. She strengthened the Warangal Fort by raising its inner wall and constructing an outer wall surrounded by a moat.

== Early life ==
Rudrama-devi, also known as Rudramba, was a daughter of her predecessor King Ganapati-deva. Kumara-svami Somapithi, in his commentary on Vidyanatha's Prataparudra-yashobhushanam, states that Rudrama was a daughter of Ganapati by queen Somamba. However, at another place in the same text, he incorrectly names Rudrama as the chief queen of Ganapati. Some other sources also incorrectly describe Rudrama as a wife of Ganapati, including the Venetian traveler Marco Polo (who visited the Kakatiya kingdom around 1293 CE), and the 17th-century text Pratapa-charitra. However, contemporary epigraphic evidence makes it clear that Rudrama was a daughter of Ganapati, not his wife.

Rudrama married Vira-bhadra, a son of Indu-shekhara, the Chalukya samanta of Nidadavolu. There are several instances of Kakatiya monarchs reinstating defeated families to power and establishing marital relations with them: it is possible that Ganapati had subjugated this Chalukya branch during his conquest of Vengi in 1240. He probably arranged Rudrama's marriage shortly after, in order to secure the political allegiance of the Chalukyas of Nidadavolu.

== Ascension ==
Ganapati apparently retired after suffering defeats at his southern frontier, against the Pandyas, in the late 1250s. He had no male heir, and nominated Rudrama as his successor. She began to rule as a co-regent from c. 1260 under the regnal name Rudra-deva Maharaja. Ganapati probably became too old and weak to govern, and assigned Rudrama to run the government. She appears to have become the sole ruler in 1263.

The 1266 CE Tripuranthakam inscription of the Kakatiya maha-pradhana Pedda Mallaya Preggada mentions Maharaja Ganapati-deva as the ruling sovereign, not Rudrama. The 1269 CE Duggi inscription of the Kakatiya subordinate Janniga-deva describes Rudrama as pattoddhati (a mistake for pattoddhrti, meaning "chose royalty"). This suggests that in 1269, Ganapati was alive and Rudrama had not formally been anointed as a sovereign: officially, she was still a queen designate.

Epigraphic evidence suggests that in the 1260s, the Kakatiyas lost control of several territories that were part of Ganapati's kingdom at its greatest extent. The southernmost territories were lost to the Pandyas, parts of coastal Andhra in the east were lost to the Gajapatis, and parts of Telangana in the north-west were lost to the Seunas (Yadavas). In the Vengi region, no Kakatiya records have been found for the period 1262–1278, which suggests that their former vassals - the Kona Haihaya and the Chalukya chiefs - no longer acknowledged the Kakatiya suzerainty. It is possible that the Kakatiya monarch granted autonomy to the Chalukyas of Nidadavolu, because Vira-bhadra of this family was Rudrama's husband; however, this is not certain.

=== Revolts ===
It appears that some nobles and Rudrama's own relatives did not approve of a woman being nominated to the throne. The 17th-century text Pratapa-charitra states that two men named Hari-hara and Murari-deva revolted against Rudrama. The text describes them as Ganapati's sons from his junior queens. It states that they captured the Kakatiya capital Warangal, and ousted Rudrama from there. Rudrama then rallied her supporters, recaptured the fort, and had her half-brothers killed. This account is not supported by any other evidence, and no other source mentions these purported sons of Ganapati, or Ganapati having any sons. According to the Tripurantakam inscription of Ganapati's sister Mailama, Hari-hara was actually a paternal uncle of Ganapati. Though the historicity of the Pratapa-charitra account is doubtful, it probably preserves the memory of a rebellion against Rudrama.

Pratapa-charitra states that Prasaditya assumed the titles Kakatiya-rajya-sthapan-acharya (Sanskrit for "a pillar of support for the Kakatiya kingdom") and Raya-pitamahanka, highlighting his role in the re-establishment of the Kakatiya power. It is Prasaditya's family chronicle, so it exaggerates his role in suppressing the rebellion against Rudrama. Several other chiefs assumed similar titles, which suggests that they may have also helped Rudrama suppress the rebellion. For example:

- The following Kakatiya subordinates assumed the title Raya-sthapan-acharya in their inscriptions dating from 1275 to 1290 CE:
  - Maha-pradhana Kannara-nayaka (or Kandara-nayaka)
  - Maha-pradhana Ganapati-deva (or Ganapad-deva) Maharajulu
  - Nisshanka Mallikarjuna Nayaka
  - Amba-deva of Kayastha family
- The Malayala chief Gundaya-nayaka and Madaya-nayaka assumed the epithets (biruda) svami-drohara-ganda
- Machaya Nayaka bore the epithet svami-drohara-ganda and svami-vamchakara-ganda

Some early 14th-century chiefs, such as Devari Nayadu (fl. 1313–1317) and Kachaya Reddi, also bear similar titles, but they likely did not fight for Rudrama; they probably assumed these titles after fighting against the invasions from the Delhi Sultanate.

== Reign ==
=== Conflict with the Gajapatis in coastal Andhra ===
Epigraphic evidence suggests that during much of the 1260s and 1270s, the Gajapatis from the north-east maintained a presence in the coastal Andhra region, which was a part of Ganapati's kingdom at its greatest extent. For example, a 1262 CE Draksharamam inscription mentions Nara-simha-naradhipa ("Narasimha, the lord of men"), who was most probably the Gajapati king Narasimha I. Bhanudeva I, the son of Narasimha, invaded Vengi around 1274 CE, as attested by his two inscriptions at Draksharamam. Arjuna-deva, the Matsya chief of Oddadi, as well as other chiefs, accompanied him.

Rudrama sent an army led by the brothers Poti Nayaka and Proli Nayaka against the Gajapati forces. The two brothers assumed the titles Gajapati-matta-matanga-simha ("lion to the rutting elephant") and Oddiyaraya-manamardana ("the destroyer of the pride of the Odia king"). This suggest that they repulsed the Gajapati invasion. Their army appears to have re-established the Kakatiya authority in much of the coastal Andhra region, with the Gajapati power restricted to the north of the Godavari River.

The Kakatiya rule in the region is attested by a 1278-1279 CE inscription of Karaparti Suraya Reddi, who describes himself as a servant of Kakatiya Rudradeva Maharaja, that is, Rudrama. His inscription records a gift to the temple of the god Bhimeshvara at Draksharamam. Epigraphic evidence suggests that the Kakatiya control of the coastal Andhra region remained unchallenged during the rest of Rudrama's reign.

=== Conflicts with the Pandyas and their vassals ===
Towards the end of the Ganapati's reign the Pandyas had conquered the southernmost part of the Kakatiya territory, including Nellore, and their vassals ruled this area in the subsequent years. The 1264 CE and 1269 CE inscriptions of Rudrama's Kayastha subordinate Janniga-deva claim that he ruled the area extending from Panugal in the north to Kaivaram-kota in the south; Ganapati had conferred this area as a fief upon him. However, epigraphic evidence suggests that much of this area was controlled by Pandya allies: the Kalukada chiefs Keshava-deva and his brother Raya-murari Soma-deva.

An undated Chidambaram inscription of the Pandya prince Vikrama states that he did not march further north because he did not want to fight a woman who had assumed the name of a king. According to historians N. Venkataramanayya and M. Somasekhara Sarma, this may be euphemistic cover for his failed expedition against Rudrama.

Inscriptions of Rudrama and her subordinates, discovered in the Kadapa and Nellore areas, suggest that Kakatiyas regained control over some of the territory that they had earlier lost to the Pandyas:

- The 1264 CE Nandalur inscription of Nagaraja, the pradhani of Rudrama's subordinate Janniga-deva, records a gift to the temple of Samuya-natha-svami.
- The 1268 CE Atluru inscription near Siddavatam also attests to Janniga-deva's control over the area. Although the inscription is damaged, and the name of the issuer is lost, his titles and date indicate that he was Janniga-deva.
- Epigraphic evidence suggests that the Kakatiyas also ousted the Pandya vassal Vira Rajendra Chola (likely Rajendra Chola III) from Nellore. Mahamandaleshvara Naga-deva Maharaja, a vassal of Rudrama, ruled at Nellore during 1271–1275.

The Kakatiya subordinates soon lost these territories to rival chiefs, who were probably Pandya vassals. The Telugu Choda chief Vijaya Ganda-gopala appears to have displaced the Kayasthas. Tiru-kalatti-deva II (alias Tribhuvana-chakravarti Irumadi), the eldest son of the former Choda ruler Manuma-siddhi II, appears to have displaced Naga-deva from Nellore in 1263. He apparently ruled Nellore during c. 1279–1283, before another Choda chief Manuma-Gandagopala displaced him.

=== Conflict with the Seunas ===
The Seuna (Yadava) king Mahadeva invaded the Kakatiya kingdom during Rudrama's reign. The Seuna records, including Mahadeva's inscriptions and Hemadri's Vrata-khanda, suggest that he achieved military successes against the ruler of Tilinga (Telangana), that is, the Kakatiya monarch. For example, they claim that Mahadeva was "the uprooter of the stalk of the lotus of the head" of the ruler of Tilinga, that he blew away this ruler like a strong wind blows away cotton, and that he "captured in battle the elephants and the five musical instruments" of this ruler. The Vrata-khanda claims that Mahadeva left Rudrama free because he was reluctant to kill a woman. The epithet "the uprooter of the stalk of the lotus of the head" appears to be a hereditary title inherited from his great-grandfather Jaitugi, who is known to have killed a Kakatiya king. Other claims made in the Seuna inscriptions are clear exaggerations.

The records from Telangana suggest that Rudrama not only repulsed the Seuna invasion, but also annexed a part of their territory. The 17th-century text Pratapa-charitra describes the episode as follows: Mahadeva besieged the Kakatiya capital Warangal for 15 days, but Rudrama led the Kakatiya forces to destroy his 300,000 infantry and 100,000 cavalry. Rudrama then chased Mahadeva to the Seuna capital Devagiri; there, Mahadeva sued for peace, agreed to pay her 10 million gold coins as war indemnity, and concluded a peace treaty. Rudrama distributed the money among her commanders, set up a victory pillar in the Seuna territory, and returned to her own kingdom.

The Pratapa-charitra claims, such as Rudrama's purported destruction of the 300,000 infantry and 100,000 cavalry, are obvious exaggerations. However, epigraphic and numismatic evidence suggests that Rudrama indeed repulsed a Seuna invasion:

- A fragmentary Bidar Fort inscription mentions Rudrama's subordinate Bhairava of Sinda family, and states that he accompanied Rudrama as a commander of her army in all her expeditions. Bidar is located in the southern part of the traditional Seuna territory, and this inscription may have been issued during Rudrama's offensive against the Seunas, in the Bedadakota (present-day Bidar) area. The inscription mentions her title as Raya-gaja-kesari, which she inherited from her father.
- A 1267 CE Panugal inscription of the Seuna prince Sharnga-pani-deva records a gift to the temple of Chhaya-Somanatha. The inscription describes him as a son of the Seuna king Simhana and a subordinate of the Kakatiya Manuma-Rudradeva, that is, Rudrama. According to historian M. Somasekhara Sarma, this Sharnga-pani-deva is same as the Sharnga-pani-deva described in the 1268 CE Hire-Kogilur inscription as the father of Mahadeva. He theorizes that Mahadeva's father Sharnga-pani-deva seized Panagal during the Seuna invasion of the Kakatiya territory, and acknowledged her suzerainty after the Seuna defeat. However, historian P.V.P. Sastry theorizes that Sharnga-pani-deva (or Sarjnapani-deva) of the Panugal inscription was another Seuna prince who sought asylum with the Kakatiyas because of his differences with Mahadeva.
- In 1922, a set of 43 gold coins issued by Seuna kings was unearthed at Rachapatnam near Kaikaluru. M. Somasekhara Sarma notes that the treasure cannot be considered to be a proof of Seuna presence in the Kakatiya country, as coins travel extensive distances; for example, Roman coins have been found in southern India because of trade. According to him, the coins may have been part of the war indemnity that the Seunas paid to Rudrama according to the Pratapa-charitra.

=== Amba-deva's revolt ===
Members of the Kayastha family, who held a fief in the southern part of the Kakatiya kingdom, appear to have been loyal to Rudrama during the tenure of the brothers Janniga-dev and Tripurari-deva. Their younger brother Amba-deva, who became the Kayastha chief in 1272, appears to have been loyal to Rudrama for some time, as suggested by his title raya-sthapanacharya ("a pillar of support for the kingdom"). However, his inscriptions do not mention any overlord, which suggests that he soon asserted independence, giving up his allegiance to Rudrama.

Amba-deva's 1290 CE Tripurantakam inscription, records his military successes, including his victories over the feudatories and allies of Rudrama.

- In 1273, he defeated the Shripati Ganapati, the ruler of the Gurindala (Gurazala or Gurijala) area. A 1268 CE Mutukur inscription suggests that Ganapati was a vassal of Rudrama.
- Amba-deva claims to have cut off heads of 75 chiefs (nayakas) in battle. These chiefs were probably Rudrama's subordinates, whom she sent to subjugate Amba-deva after his victory over Shripati Ganapati. The number 75 and the beheading claim are likely poetic exaggeration, and may be interpreted to mean that Amba-deva simply defeated the entire Kakatiya army.
- Amba-deva claims to have caused his destruction or ruin (vidhvamsa) of Kopperunjinga alias Kadava-raya, a Pandya vassal who was also possibly a Kakatiya ally at the time.
- Sometime before 1281, Amba-deva appointed Manuma Ganda-gopala on the throne of Nellore.
- Amba-deva defeated Manu-Mallideva, the Telugu Choda ruler of the Eruva region, and annexed his territories. Although Manu-Mallideva's inscriptions do not mention any overlord, he may have been a Kakatiya subordinate.
- Amba-deva also defeated the Pandya ruler Maravarman Kulashekhara, and his allies, the Kalukada chiefs. He established a marital alliance with a chief named Bollaya, and conquered the Pendekallu area.

With these victories, Amba-deva carved out an independent principality that included almost all of the former south-western parts of the Kakatiya territory to the south of the Krishna River. As a result, at the time of Rudrama's death, the Kakatiya kingdom was smaller than the one she had inherited; nevertheless, it was still larger than it had been during the early part of her father's reign. The distribution of inscriptions that mention her as sovereign suggests that the Kakatiya sphere of influence shrank during her reign.

== Death ==
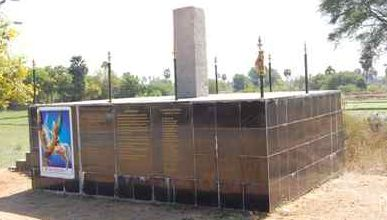
The 1289 CE Chandupatla inscription that mentions the death of Rudrama

Rudrama appears to have been killed in November 1289 CE by Amba-deva's forces. This theory is supported by the following evidence:

- The 27 November 1289 Chandupatla inscription records warrior Puvvula Mummadi's gift of some land to the god Soma-natha-deva, for the merit of Rudrama (called "Kakati Rudrama-devi") and her general Mallikarjuna-nayaka. It states that both of them had attained Shiva-loka, that is, died, presumably a few days before the date of the record.
- A 1290 CE inscription, issued by Mallikarjuna's son Immadi Mallikarjuna-nayaka, attests that Mallikarjuna was a general of Rudrama; this inscription was issued for the merit of "Kumara Rudra-deva Maharaja".
- These inscriptions suggest that Rudrama and her general Mallikarjuna died at the same time. According to historian P.V.P. Sastry, Rudrama was likely very old at the time - around eighty years - and therefore, probably did not lead her forces in a battle. However, she may have accompanied her army - commanded by Mallikarjuna - to inspire them.
- Amba-deva's 1290 CE Tripurantakam inscription states he deprived Mallikarjuna-pati of seven limbs. This Mallikarjuna, whom the inscription describes as an enemy of gods and brahmanas, appears to be same as Rudrama's general Mallikarjuna. In this context, the "seven limbs" appear to refer to the seven constituent members of Mallikarjuna's royalty, defined in the Sanskrit thesaurus Amara-ksoha as "king, minister, friend, treasury, territory, forts and forces".
- Amba-deva's revolt is the only political disturbance known to have taken place in the Kakatiya kingdom around 1289 CE. Besides claiming to have deprived Mallikarjuna of his overlord (one of the "limbs"), Amba-deva also claims to have "vanquished" all the kings of Andhra. This suggests that he was responsible for killing Rudrama: according to Sastry, he did not explicitly state that he killed Rudrama, because boasting about killing an old woman would have discredited him as a warrior.

In 2017, archaeologist D. Kanna Babu of Archaeological Survey of India identified two sculptures at Pochalamma temple in Bollikunta as depictions of Rudrama. The first sculpture shows her riding a horse with reins in her left hand and a sword in her right hand; it features an overhead umbrella - the royal insignia. The second sculpture shows her tired, seated sorrowfully, and leaning towards left; the royal umbrella is missing, presumably because she lost it in the battle; and there is a buffalo - the vehicle of Yama, the lord of death. According to Babu's interpretation, the sculptures depict Rudrama's death in a battle against Amba-deva.

Around 1291, during the reign of Rudrama's successor Prataparudra, the Kakatiya forces defeated Amba-deva. Earlier historians believed that Rudramadevi ruled until 1295, because some records before this year name Prataparudra as Kumara (Prince) Rudra. However, the discovery of the Chandupatla inscription confirmed that Rudramadevi died before 27 November 1289. Moreover, some records before 1295 (such as the 1292 Inkirala inscription) call Prataparudra a Maharaja ("great king"). It appears that Prataparudra continued to be called Kumara Rudra for some years after ascending the throne, because this was a familiar usage.

== Administration ==
According to an early 14th-century text, Rudrama's father Ganapati considered her equal to a son, and therefore, decided to use a male persona for her. Rudrama thus promoted a male image to rule in a patrilineal society that traditionally excluded women from political power: she assumed a male name and wore masculine clothing. Her husband Vira-bhadra finds few mentions in historical records and did not actively participate in the administration.

Rudrama recruited several non-aristocratic warriors into the Kakatiya service: her successor Prataparudra as well as the later Vijayanagara emperors adopted this policy as well. Epigraphic evidence suggests that during and after the later part of Ganapati's reign, the number and proportion of officers (as opposed to chiefs and princes) among individuals acknowledging Kakatiya overlordship increased significantly. For example, out of the 34 Kakatiya subordinates known from Kakatiya inscriptions during the early part of Ganapati's reign (c. 1199-1230 CE), 47% were chiefs and princes, while 26% were officers. From Rudrama's reign, 63 subordinates are known: only 17% of these were chiefs and princes, while 38% were officers. This suggests that, during this period, the noble families declined while the importance of the officers grew. In the Kakatiya administration, the officers with the designation anga-rakshaka (bodyguard) first appeared during Rudrama's rule, and virtually disappeared during the reign of her successor Prataparudra.

The Malayala Reddis and Recherla Reddi chiefs, who played an important role during the reigns of the preceding kings Rudra and Ganapati, appear to have retired from active service during Rudrama's reign. New chiefs, such as Reddis of Gona family and the Velamas, emerged as the important generals during her time.

Notable subordinates of Rudrama included:

- The Reddi chiefs of the Gona family: Gona Gannaya Reddy and his general Vitthala helped Rudrama's successor Prataparudra conquer the Bellary and Raichur forts from the Seunas.
- The Velama chief Prasaditya, who commanded the south-western region of the Kakatiya kingdom.
- The Kayastha brothers Janniga-deva, Tripurantaka (alias Tripurari), and Amba-deva, who ruled in succession. Amba-deva appears to have been loyal to Rudrama for some time, as suggested by his title raya-sthapan-acharya, before he asserted independence.
- The Are vassals migrated from western Deccan to the Srisailam area, which came to be known as Are-bhumi or Are-vidu. Sharnga-pani-deva, a son of the Seuna king Simhana, was the most important Are vassal of Rudrama. Ranaka Gopa-deva-raja, a military commander mentioned in the 1273 CE Gundalapadu inscription, was another chief of Are ancestry.
- Bhairava, son of Maila of Sinda family, was a vassal of Rudrama. According to the Bidar inscription, he assisted the queen in her successful military campaigns in Vengi, Dravila, and the Seuna kingdom.
- Sura, a chief (samanta) of the Viriyala family, served the queen as a military commander (senadhipati) in the northern region.
- The chiefs of the Cheraku family served as Rudrama's commanders in the southern region.
- Minister (maha-pradhana) and commander (senadhipati) Annaya-deva of Induluri family was Rudrama's son-in-law.
- Ponkala Mallaya Preggada, another maha-pradhana, held the office of bahattara-niyogadhipati, the superintendent of 72 niyogas or royal offices.

== Constructions ==
Rudrama continued the fortification of Warangal by raising the height of a curtain wall, approximately 0.75 miles (1.21 km) in diameter, to 20 feet (6.1 m). This wall was made of granite blocks, was surrounded by a wide moat, and had 45 bastions, which were 40–60 feet on a side. She also commissioned the construction of an outer earthen wall, 1.5 miles (2.4 km) in diameter, and surrounded by an additional 150 150 feet (46 m)-wide moat.

Rudrama built a ranga-mandapa dedicated to her family deity Svayambhu-deva (Shiva) in the Warangal Fort. A sculpture discovered among the ruins of this structure depicts her as a lion-mounted warrior holding a dagger and a shield in her hands. The image also depicts an elephant holding a lotus in its trunk: according to historian P.V.P. Sastry, it represents Rudrama's title Raya-gaja-kesari.

== Family and succession ==
Rudrama and her husband Vira-bhadra had three daughters: Mummadamma, Rudrama, and Ruyyama (alias Ruyyamba). According to Vidyanatha's Prataparudra-Yashobhushana, Mummadamma married Mahadeva. Rudrama, the princess who shared her mother's name, married the Seuna (Yadava) prince Yellana-deva (or Ellana-deva), who held a fief near Guntur, as suggested by his Alapadu inscription. Ruyyama married the minister and commander Annaya-deva of Induluri family, who was a son of Gannaya.

Since queen Rudrama had no son, her father Ganapati asked her to adopt Mummadamma's son Prataparudra alias Vira-rudra as her own son. Rudrama did so, and nominated Prataparudra as her successor.

Rudrama had a sister named Ganapama-devi (or Ganapamba), who married Beta of Kota family.

== In popular culture ==
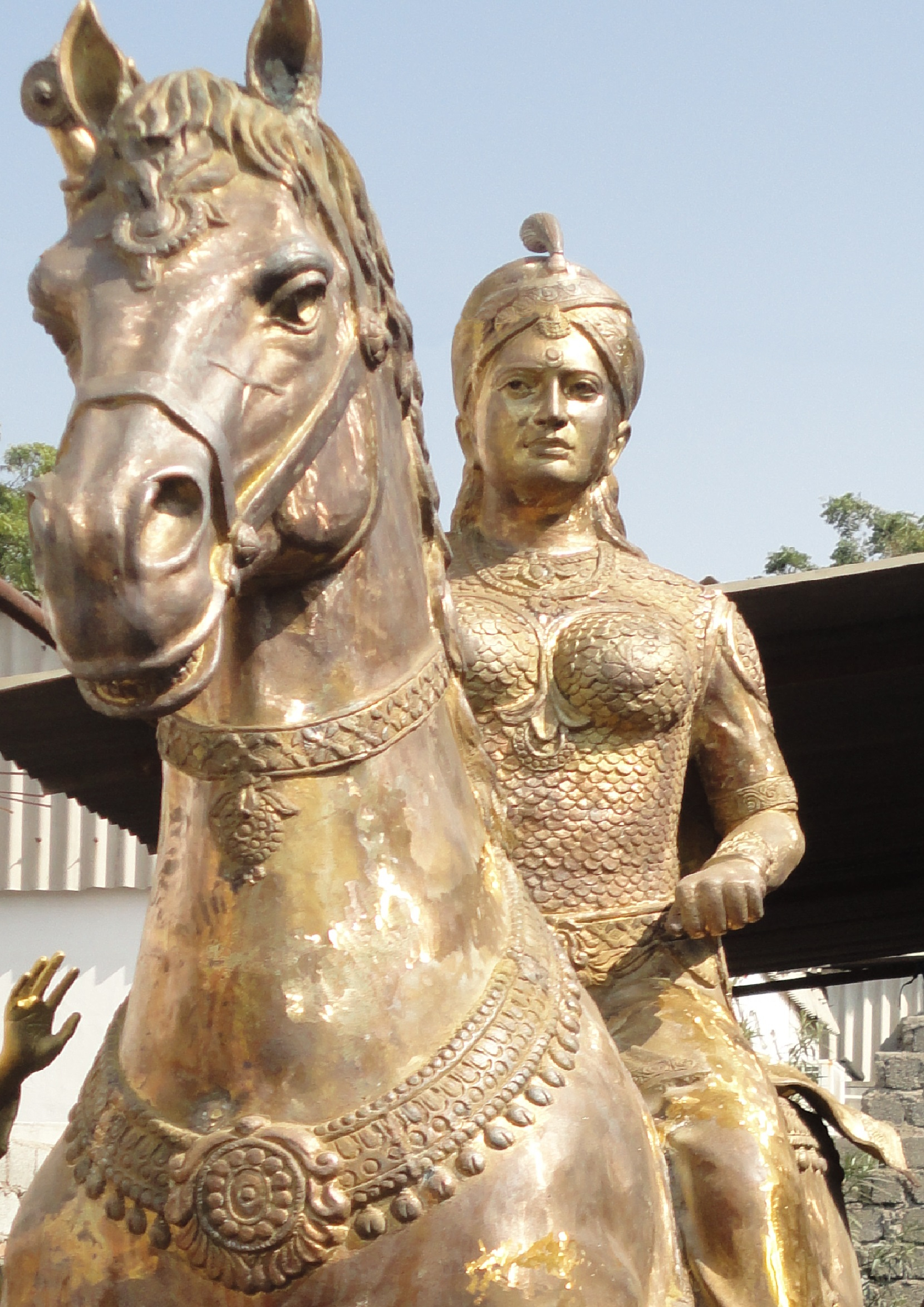
A 21st century statue of Rudrama

Among the historical rulers of India, Rudrama was one of the few women who inherited the throne from her father. She was also among the most successful women rulers of medieval South Asia, by the length of her reign as well as by the area of her kingdom. The historical traditions written in the centuries immediately following her death did not celebrate her as an important female monarch, and instead presented her as a widow queen who ruled on behalf of her infant son. However, in the 20th century, she became a source of regional pride in the Andhra Pradesh (later split into Telangana).

In 2015, filmmaker Gunasekhar made a Telugu film Rudhramadevi on the life of Rudrama Devi with Anushka Shetty playing the titular role.

Peninsula Pictures produced a serial on Star Maa titled Rudramadevi which pictured the childhood of Rudramadevi to the TV viewers for 100 episodes.

== See also ==
- History of women in early modern warfare
