= Warangal (disambiguation) =

Warangal is a metropolitan city in Telangana, India.

Warangal may also refer to

== Places and administrative divisions ==
- Warangal district, formerly Warangal Rural district
- Warangal Urban district, now renamed as Hanamkonda district
- Warangal mandal
- Warangal Division
- Warangal Police Commissionerate
- Warangal Tri-City
- Greater Warangal Municipal Corporation

== Constituencies ==
- Warangal (Lok Sabha constituency)
- Warangal West (Assembly constituency)
- Warangal East (Assembly constituency)

== Infrastructure ==
- Warangal Airport
- Warangal railway station
- Warangal Monorail
- Warangal Metro
- Outer Ring Road, Warangal

== Other uses ==
- Warangal Fort
- Siege of Warangal (disambiguation)
  - Siege of Warangal (1310), by Malik Kafur, a general of Ala al-Din Khalji
  - Siege of Warangal (1318), by Khusrau Khan and other generals of Ala al-Din's son Mubarak Shah
  - Siege of Warangal (1323), by Ulugh Khan (later Muhammad bin Tughluq), a general of Ghiyath al-Din Tughluq

== See also ==
- National Institute of Technology, Warangal
- Kakatiya dynasty, 11th century dynasty who ruled from Warangal
