= Ambadeva =

13th-century Kayastha chief

Amba-deva was a 13th-century chief who carved out an independent principality in present-day Andhra Pradesh in southern India. He was a member of the Kayastha family, whose members were vassals to the Kakatiya monarchs. Amba-deva succeeded his elder brother Tripurari as the Kayastha chief in 1272, and soon gave up allegiance to the Kakatiya queen Rudrama. He defeated several Kakatiya subordinates, and also fought against the neighbouring Pandyas and their vassals to carve out an independent principality with its capital at Valluru-pattana. A Kakatiya force sent by Rudrama's successor Prataparudra defeated him in mid-1291.

== Background and early life ==
Amba-deva came from the Kayastha family, who were subordinates to the Kakatiya family. His elder brothers - first Janniga-deva and then Tripurari-deva (alias Tripurantaka) - preceded him as Kayastha chiefs. In the early 1260s, the neighbouring Pandyas captured the southern part of the Kakatiya kingdom. The 1264 CE and 1269 CE inscriptions of Janniga-deva suggest that he re-established the Kakatiya power in this area. Janniga-deva's successor Tripurari also remained loyal to Rudrama, and ruled as her subordinate during 1270–1272.

According to Janniga-deva's inscriptions, he ruled the area extending from Panugal in the north to Kaivaram-kota in the south; the Kakatiya monarch Ganapati had conferred this area as a fief upon him. However, epigraphic evidence suggests that the Kalukada chiefs - Keshava-deva and his brother Raya-murari Soma-deva - controlled much of this area.

Amba-deva succeeded his brother Tripurari-deva as the Kayastha chief in 1272 CE, and remained in that position for 32 years. He appears to have been loyal to the Kakatiya monarch Rudrama for some time, as suggested by his title raya-sthapanacharya ("a pillar of support for the kingdom"). However, his inscriptions do not mention any overlord, which suggests that he soon asserted independence, giving up his allegiance to the Kakatiya queen Rudrama. It is not clear what circumstances led him to this decision.

== Military successes ==
Ambadeva's 1290 CE Tripurantakam inscription, written in Sanskrit language, records his military successes, including his victories over the feudatories (mandalikas) of Rudrama. The chronology of these victories is not certain, but can be determined to some degree with the help of other contemporary records.

=== Shripati Ganapati ===
According to the Tripurantakam inscription, in 1273, Amba-deva defeated the Kakatiya vassal Shripati Ganapati, the ruler of the Gurindala (Gurazala or Gurijala) area, and assumed Ganapati's title Raya sahasra-malla.

Ganapati's rule over the Gurindala area is attested by his 1268 Mutukur inscription, and by Amba-deva's Nilagangavaram inscription, which calls him Gurindala Ganapati.

Another inscription, engraved on the same stone as Ganapati's Mutukur inscription on the same day, states that the local Vira Balanja community made a gift to a village temple on behalf of Rudrama. This suggests that Ganapati was a vassal of Rudrama. It is not clear what circumstances led to her conflict with Amba-deva.

In the Tripurantakam inscription, Amba-deva claims to have cut off the heads of 75 chiefs (nayakas) in battle. These chiefs were probably Rudrama's subordinates, whom she sent to subjugate Amba-deva after his victory over Shripati Ganapati. The number 75 and the beheading claim are likely poetic exaggeration, and may be interpreted to mean that Amba-deva simply defeated the entire Kakatiya army.

=== Kopperunjinga ===
According to the Tripurantakam inscription, Amba-deva caused his destruction or ruin (vidhvamsa) of Kopperunjinga alias Kadava-raya, which suggests that Kopperunjinga was killed in a battle against Amba-deva, probably near Nandalur.

The inscription dates this event to Shaka 1184 (1261-1262 CE), but this is likely an error; the event probably took place around 1278–1279, which is the last known year of Kopperunjinga's rule. At the time, Kopperunjinga may have been a Pandya vassal sent to support the Kalukada chiefs, and possibly, a Kakatiya ally who was guarding Nellore.

Kopperunjinga may have been supported by the Telugu Choda Vijaya Ganda-gopala, whose 1278-1279 CE Nandalur inscription suggests that he invaded the Kayastha territory.

=== Support to Manuma Ganda-gopala ===
The Tripurantakam inscription states that Amba-deva appointed Manuma Ganda-gopala on the throne of Nellore. Manuma Ganda-gopala was a rival of Vijaya Ganda-gopala, who had earlier driven him out of Nellore. After Vijaya's death in 1279, Manuma sought Amba-deva's help to regain control of Nellore.

This event must have taken place sometime before 1282, as attested by Manuma's 1284 CE Kodavaluru inscription, which is dated to his third regnal year.

=== Manu-Mallideva ===
Amba-deva defeated Manu-Mallideva, the Telugu Choda ruler of the Eruva region, and annexed his territories. The Tripurantakam inscription describes Amba-deva as the hero who took the head of Mallideva. Manu-Mallideva is known from two Tripurantakam inscriptions, both probably dated 1267–1268, which do not mention any overlord. He may have been a Kakatiya subordinate.

=== Kalukada chiefs ===
The Tripurantakam inscription states that Amba-deva defeated the Kalukada chiefs Keshava-deva and Somi-deva, and their ally, the Telugu Chola ruler Allu Ganga of Gutti.

The 1282-1283 Gundluru inscription of Somi-deva suggests that the Kalukada chiefs supported the Pandya invasion of Pottapi-nadu. According to M. Somasekhara Sarma, Amba-deva may have defeated them after he forced the Pandyas to retreat to the south around 1286. However, according to P.V.P. Sastry, the event took earlier, as the Tripurantakam inscription mentions it immediately after his victory over Shripati Ganapati in 1273 CE.

With this victory, Amba-deva seized the former Kayastha territory that had been controlled by the Pandya vassals in the early 1260s. He made Valluru-pattana his capital, and strengthened the hill fort of Gandikota-Monrathapura.

=== Maravarman Kulasekhara Pandya I ===
Around 1286, Amba-deva, according to the Tripurantakam inscription, "vanquished" the Pandya ruler Maravarman Kulasekhara Pandya I.

An inscription discovered at Lepaka near Rajampet, and dated the 13th regnal year of the Pandya ruler Maravarman Sundara, suggests that the Pandya army marched to the Pottapi-nadu region in 1282-1283 CE. Led by Jatavarman Sundara II, Maravarman Sundara, and Maravarman Kulashekhara, this army captured the Lepaka-Nandalur region. Epigraphic evidence suggests that the Pandyas ruled this region for around 5 years, with Pillai Pallava-rayan of Tunjalur serving as the regional administrator.

Nothing is known about Amba-deva's activity in this region at the time, but it appears that the Pandyas defeated him. The 1283 CE Akkareddipalli (near Badvel) inscription, which records the construction of a Shiva temple, mentions Gandapendera Tripurai-deva Maharaja as the ruler of the area. According to one theory, this ruler was Tripurari-deva II, a son of Ambadeva's elder brother Tripurari-deva, and may have ruled the territory lost by Amba-deva.

After their defeat against Amba-deva around 1286, the Pandyas seem to have retreated from the region.

=== Alliance with Bollaya ===
Amba-deva married his daughter to Rajanna, the son of a chief named Bollaya, and conferred upon him the territory around Nandanapura (Nandavaram near Banaganapalli). He did probably to seek Bollaya's support for his march to the nearby Pendekallu.

=== Pendekallu ===
Amba-deva invaded the Pendekallu area, and the Kakatiya queen Rudrama probably sent an army to oppose him. In his Tripurantakam inscription, Amba-deva claims to have "vanquished" all the kings of Andhra, and acquired glory. This is likely a reference to his victory over Rudrama's feudatories.

=== Role in deaths of Rudrama and Mallikarjuna ===
Amba-deva killed Mallikarjuna, whom the Tripurantakam inscription describes as an enemy of gods and brahmanas. The inscription states that Amba-deva deprived Mallikarjuna of seven limbs, which in this context, appears to mean "seven constituent members of Mallikarjuna's royalty". According to the Amara-kosha these seven "limbs" refer to "king, minister, friend, treasury, territory, forts and forces"; this suggests that Amba-deva also killed Mallikarjuna's overlord Rudrama.

The Chandupatla inscription records a land gift for the merit of Rudrama and Mallikarjuna, stating that they had "attained Shiva-loka", that is, died. This suggests that Rudrama and her general Mallikarjuna died together in November 1289. According to historian P.V.P. Sastry, Rudrama was likely very old at the time, and did not lead her army; she may have accompanied her army - commanded by Mallikarjuna - to inspire them.

Amba-deva's revolt is the only political disturbance known to have taken place in the Kakatiya kingdom around 1289 CE. Combined with Amba-deva's claim of having killed all the kings of Andhra, this suggests that he killed Rudrama. Sastry theorizes that Amba-deva's avoids explicitly claiming that he killed Rudrama, because boasting about killing an old woman would have discredited him as a warrior.

== Proclamation of sovereignty ==
The 1290 CE Tripurantakam inscription practically proclaims Amba-deva's sovereignty. Amba-deva established an independent principality that included almost all of the former south-western parts of the Kakatiya territory to the south of the Krishna River.

According to Amba-deva's 1287 CE Attirala inscription, his principality included his capital Valluru-pattana, Gandikota, Muliki-nadu, Renadu, Pendekallu, Sakili, Eruva, and Pottapi-nadu. His rule probably extended up to Gutti in the west, as a verse in the Tripurantakam inscription suggests that the fort of "Jaga-traya-gupti" (Sanskritized form of "Jagatapi Gutti") was under his protection. Twelve vassals served him.

== Defeat against Prataparudra ==
By 1290 CE, Amba-deva appears to have allied with the Pandyas and the Seunas against the Kakatiyas. His Tripurantakam inscription states that the Pandyas nourished friendship with him by sending him elephants and horses, and that the Seuna king gifted him ornaments of gold and gems. His Nila-gangavaram inscription also states that the Pandya king aided him by sending him elephants and horses.

In 1290 CE, Rudrama's successor Prataparudra defeated Manuma-Gandagopala, whom Amba-deva had appointed to the throne of Nellore. In 1291, Rudradeva marched to Tripurantakam against Amba-deva, accompanied by a large army under the command of the Kolani chief Manuma-Gannaya and the Induluri chief Annaya-deva. According to Shiva-yoga-saram, these Kolani and Induluri chiefs, inspired by Rudradeva, dispersed the enemy forces and captured 72 forts. This suggests that the Kakatiya army defeated Amba-deva. Amba-deva's last record at Tripurantakam is dated 13 June 1291; the earliest record of Manuma-Gannaya and Annaya-deva at the place is dated 11 August 1291. This suggests that the Kakatiya defeated Amba-deva sometime between these two dates.
