= Siege of Warangal =

Siege of Warangal may refer to these sieges of Warangal in India:

- Siege of Warangal (1310) by Malik Kafur, a general of Ala al-Din Khalji
- Siege of Warangal (1318) by Khusrau Khan and other generals of Ala al-Din's son Mubarak Shah
- Siege of Warangal (1323) by Ulugh Khan (later Muhammad bin Tughluq), a general of Ghiyath al-Din Tughluq

== See also ==
- Warangal (disambiguation)
