= Warangal Fort =

Building in Telangana, India

Warangal Fort Orugallu Fort
- Warangal, Telangana, India
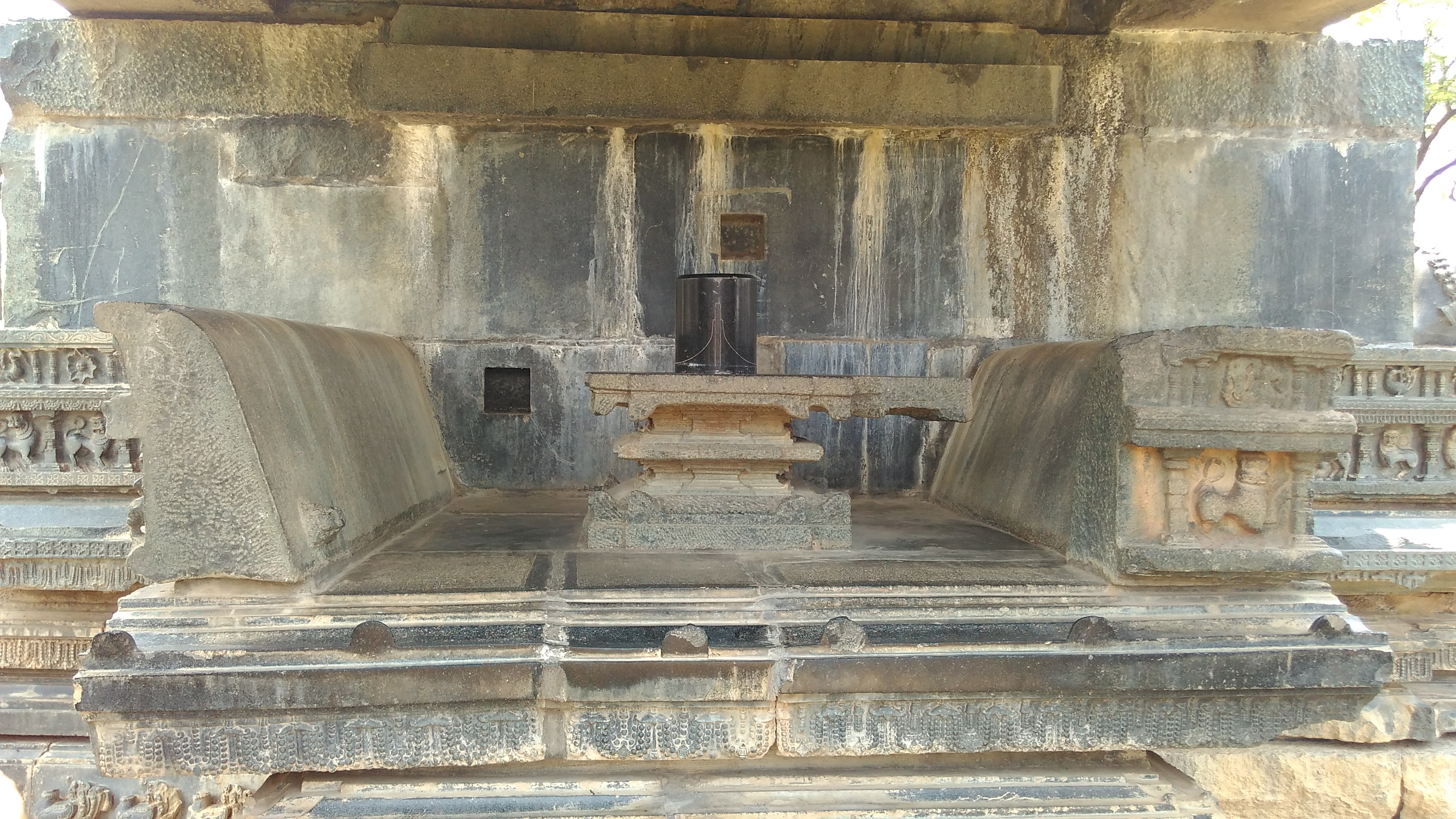
- View of the Shiva Lingam at the Fort complex

Site information
- Type: Fort
- Open to the public: Yes
- Condition: Ruins

Location
- Location within Telangana
- Coordinates: 17°57′21″N 79°36′52″E

Site history
- Built: 13th century
- Built by: Prataparudra II; Musunuri Kapaya Nayaka
- Materials: Stone and mud
- Battles/wars: Siege of Warangal (1310); Siege of Warangal (1318); Siege of Warangal (1323)

Warangal Fort is located in Warangal District, Telangana, India. It was the capital city of Kakatiya dynasty and the Musunuri Nayakas. The fort appears to have existed since at least the 12th century when it was the capital of the Kakatiyas. The fort has four ornamental gates, known as Kakatiya Kala Thoranam, and also Orugallu fort that originally formed the entrances to a now ruined great Shiva temple. The Kakatiyan arch has been adopted and officially incorporated into the emblem of Telangana after the bifurcation of Andhra Pradesh. The fort is included in the "tentative list" of UNESCO World Heritage Site and was submitted by the Permanent Delegation of India to UNESCO on 10/09/2010.

== History ==
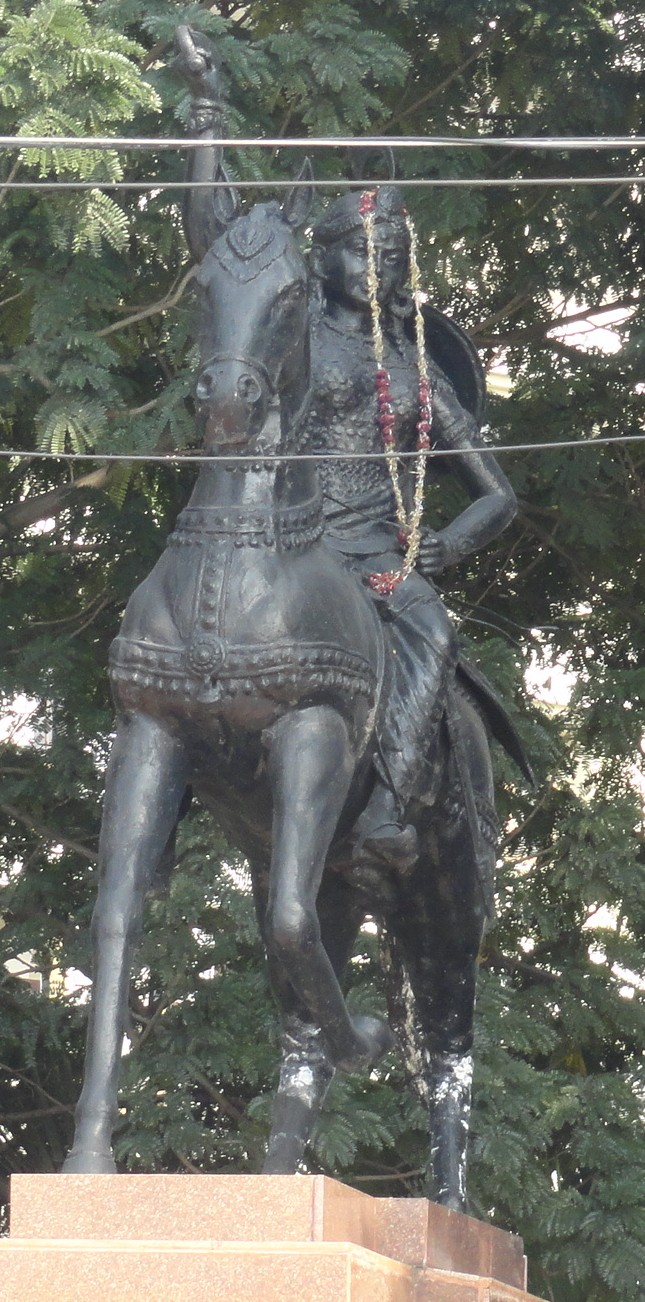
Equestrian statue of Rudrama Devi, one of the rulers of the Kakatiya dynasty and builder of the fort complex

Initially, Warangal was under the rule of the Rashtrakuta dynasty in the 8th century AD and Western Chalukya Empire in 10th century AD; in the 12th century, it came under the control of the sovereign Kakatiya dynasty. Although precise dating of its construction and subsequent enhancements is uncertain, historians and archaeologists generally agree that an earlier brick-walled structure was replaced with stone by Ganapatideva (1199 AD-1262 AD), and was completed by his daughter Rudrama Devi, who ruled until 1289, and further strengthened by her grandson Prataparudra II, whose reign came to be known as a "Golden Age". Twenty years later, the kingdom was conquered by the Delhi Sultanate.

Ganapatideva, Rudrama Devi, and Prataparudra II all added to the fort's height, building gateways, square bastions, and additional circular earthen walls. This places the construction towards the end of the Kakatiya period.

In 1309, Malik Kafur, the general of Alauddin Khalji, attacked the fort with a large force of 100,000 men and surrounded it. Prataparudra II and his people secured themselves within the formidable stone-walled fort and battled bravely for several months with the invading army. As the siege was unable to be lifted for more than six months, Prataparudra II II agreed to a truce with Kafur, as the latter had unleashed massive destruction on the neighboring towns and villages. This truce included the notable Koh-i-Noor diamond along with various precious treasures, which he took it back to Delhi.

This siege was chronicled by Amir Khusrow, who described how the fortifications consisted of a strong outer hardened mud structure with a deep ditch in front that had to be filled with dirt before the army could surmount it. The inner fortress was built of stone and surrounded by a moat that the Muslim soldiers swam across. The fort as described by Khusrow corresponds to the two inner circles of fortifications that exist today, and is visible from above. When Kafur finally left the fort in March 1310, he carried away the bounty on 2,000 camels.

Again in 1318, Warangal Fort was attacked by the Sultanate army of Qutbuddin Mubarak Shah commanded by Khusro Khan, a son of Alauddin Khalji and was held in a siege. The invaders put up a 450 feet (140 m) earthen ramp across the moat which enabled them to breach the stone walls of the fort and capture it. Prataparudra II again paid a huge tribute to the Sultan in the form of a contingent of horses and elephants, which became an annual fee to be paid to the Delhi Sultanate.

In 1320, the then ruler of Delhi who had replaced Khalji, Sultan Ghiyath al-Din Tughluq, sent his son Ulugh Khan to attack Warangal fort once again, as Prataparudra II had not accepted the Tughluqs as overlords and refused to pay the tribute. For a third and final time, the fort was attacked by Sultan Muhammad bin Tughluq (r. 1325–1351), who held siege over the fort. Due to internal dissension, Ulugh Khan had to retreat to Devagiri. After a temporary respite of 4–6 months, Ulugh Khan came back in 1323 with 63,000 mounted soldiers carrying archery, attacked the fort and used brutal tactics to breach the walls for 5 months with huge loss of men, possible only due to a doggedly attempt by Prataprudra II who manned the fort with only a few thousand troops as many of them were sent away across the countryside, and food supplies which were thrown open to the citizens to celebrate their victory over the Tughlaqs. He resorted to massacre of the population outside the fortress, which forced Prataparudra II to accept surrender and opened the fort gates. The Sultanate forces then plundered and destroyed the capital within and outside the stone wall, depriving it of its beautiful temples, royal enclosures, water tanks, palaces, farmlands and other important structures, leaving it completely in a state of ruin. In keeping with that tradition, Ulugh Khan ordered the destruction of the great Swayambhusiva Temple where the state deity, the Swayambhu (self-manifested) Chaturmukhalinga Swamy (linga with four faces of Lord Shiva), had been deified since early 11th century AD under the rule of Prola II. All that is now visible of the temple are remnants scattered around the centre of the fort, reminding visitors of its once charming presence, and the splendid architectural beauty combined with excellent stonework and sculptural value of the period that leaves everyone in awe. Then, the Tughluqan authorities built an enormous mosque to one side of the fort, which was demolished by the local Nayaka chieftains in 1335. Prataparudra II, who had surrendered and was sent to Delhi, perished en route on the banks of the Narmada River. It is said that he committed suicide in 1323. The city of Warangal was then renamed as Sultanpur, and from 1324 to 1332 imperial coins were minted there. The Delhi Sultanate managed to hold Sultanpur until 1335, when the local Nayakas (72 of the chieftains) formed a union and took control. The fort then came under the control of the Bahmani Sultanate, Qutb Shahi dynasty of Golconda and later under the rule of the Nizam of Hyderabad.

Subsequent modifications to the fort were made between the 15th and 17th centuries, mainly with the addition of Barbicans to the four gates in the stone wall and the creation of gates in the outer earthen wall. Remnants of the structure can be seen today near Warangal. The Archaeological Survey of India has listed the ruins as a Monument of National Importance.

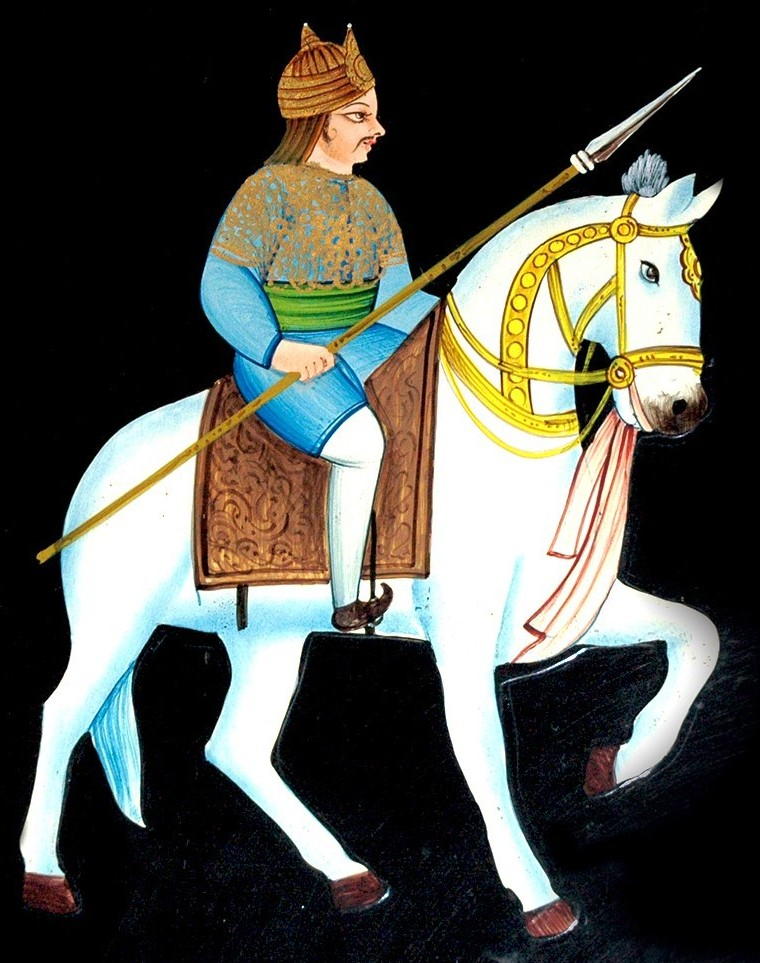
Musunuri Kapaya Nayaka

Musunuri Kapaya Nayaka was a very prominent South Indian ruler in the 14th century. He made several modifications to the fort walls and defended it until the Bahmani Sultanate took over it in the mid 15th century AD from the Recherla Nayakas of Rachakonda.

== Features ==
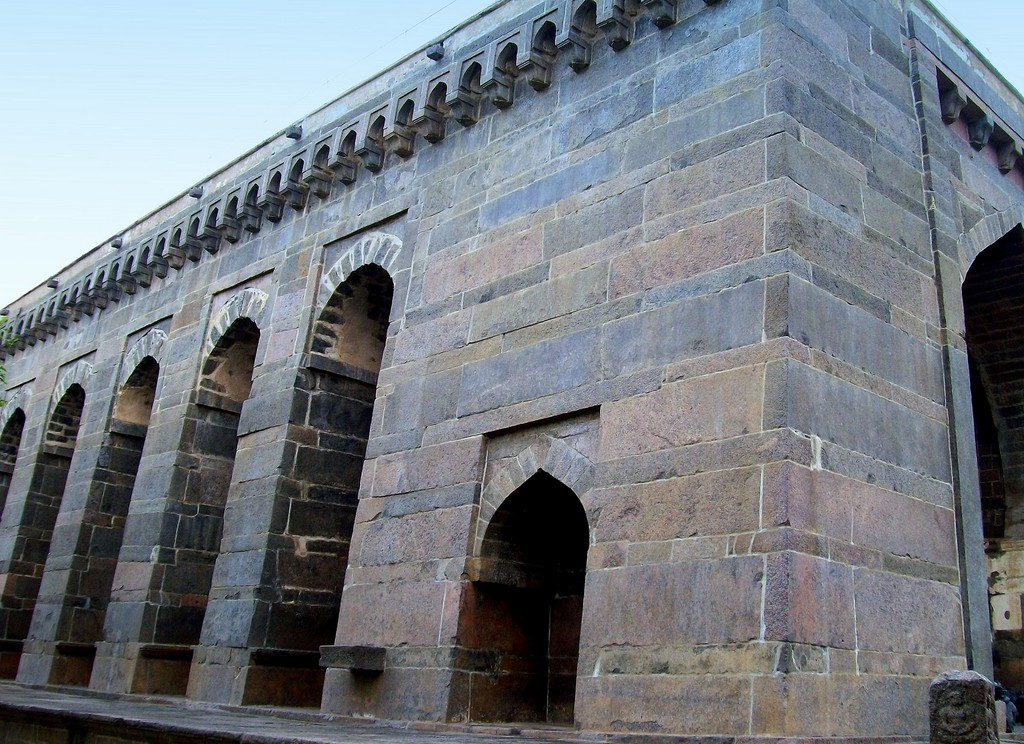
The Kush Mahal

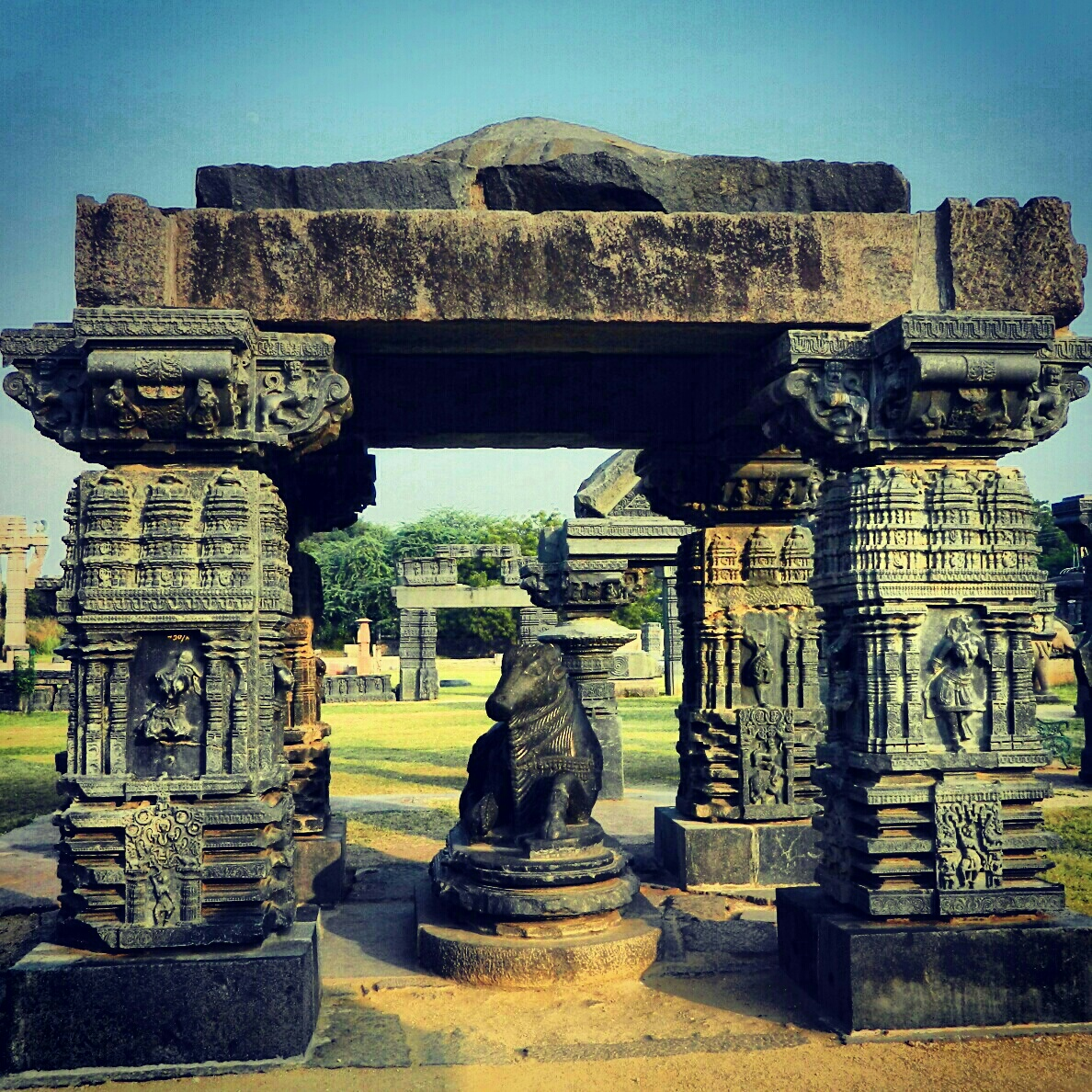
Pillared mandapa with a Nandi (bull) in the fort complex

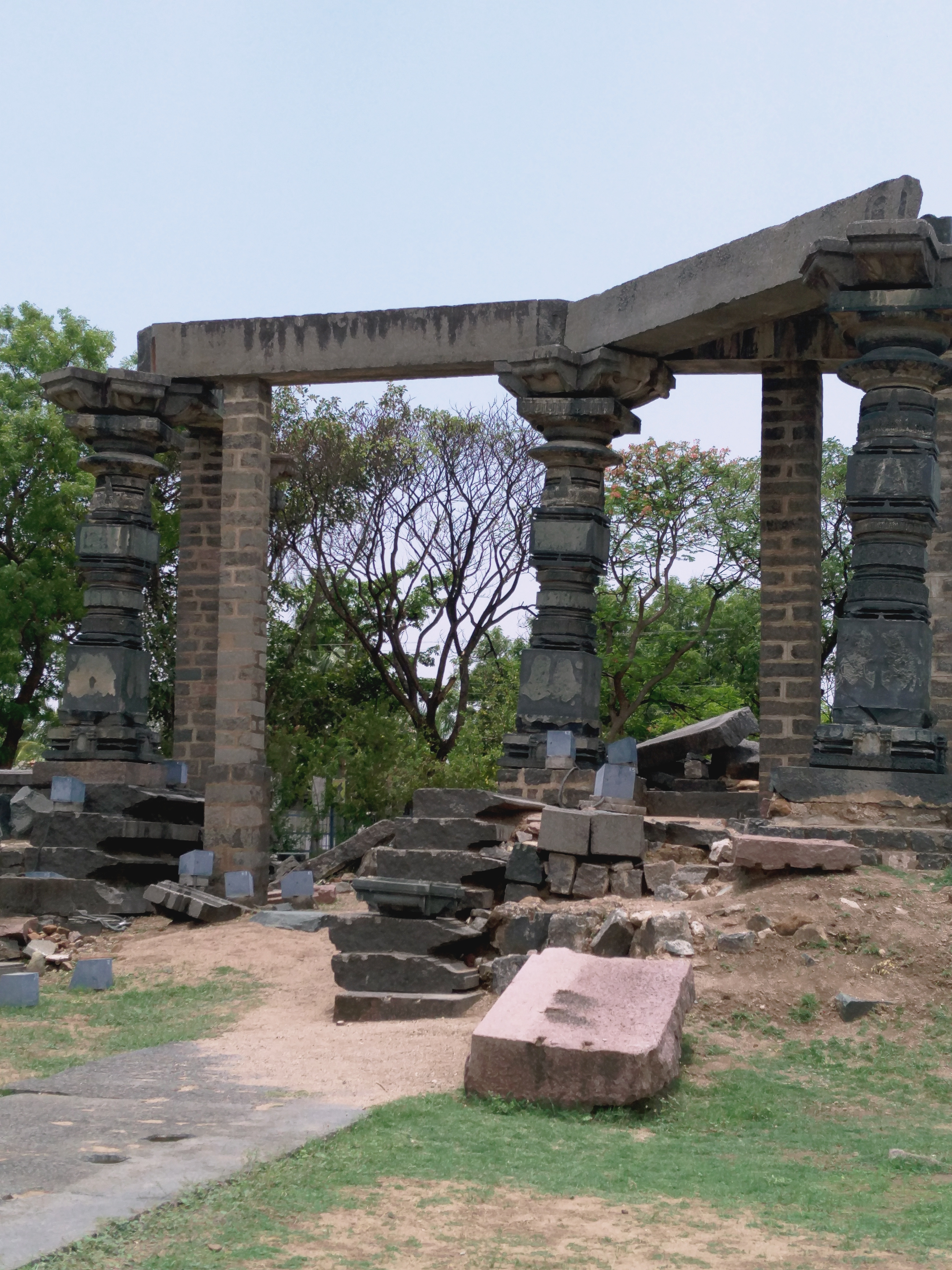

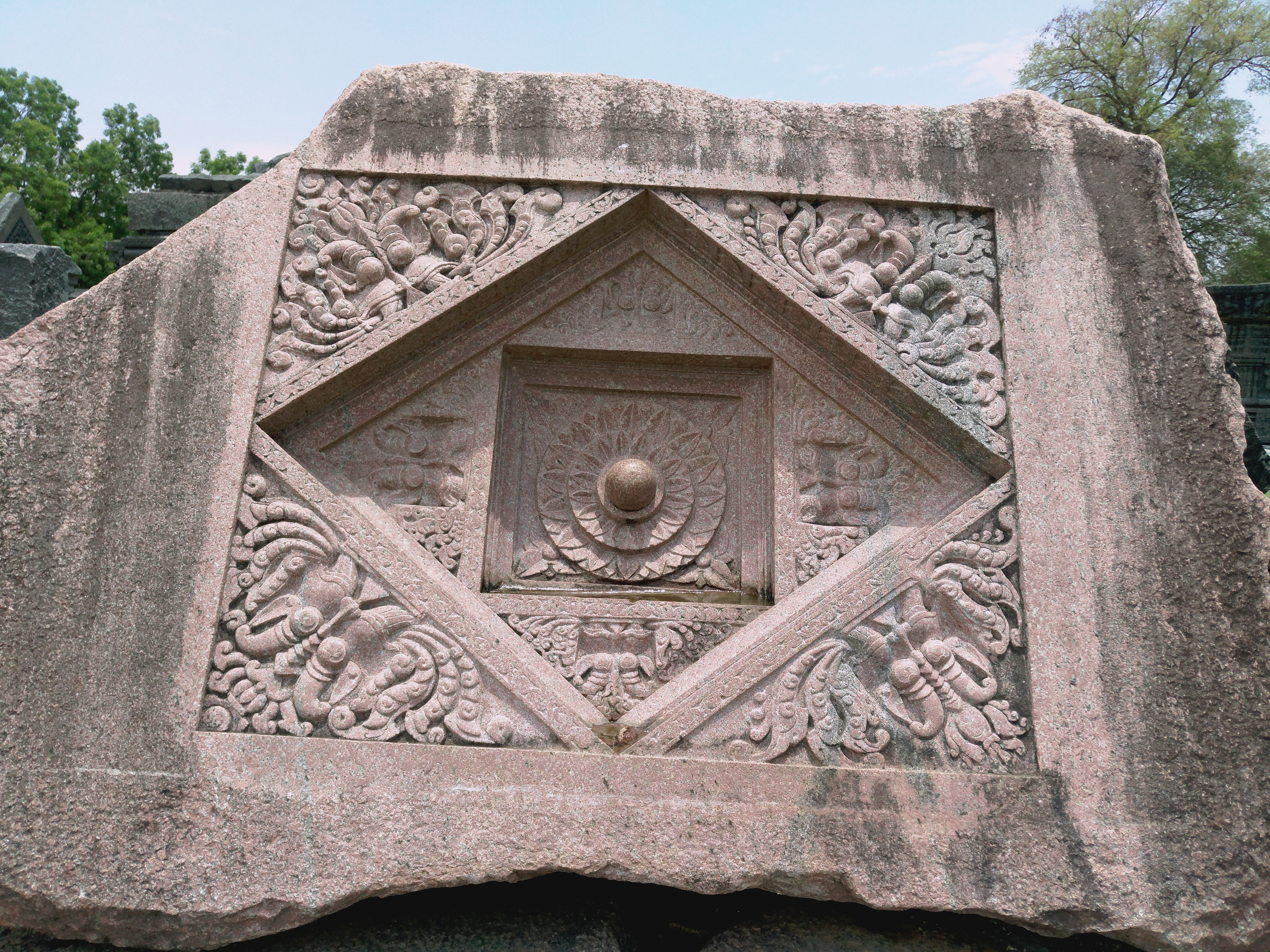
Architecture Warangal Fort

Warangal Fort is laid out in three concentric circular walls with defensive fortifications. The first structure, built during the reign of Rudrama Devi, was in the form an earthen embankment 1.5 miles (2.4 km) in diameter. A moat of about 150 feet (46 m) width was dug around this wall, forming the outer limits of the fort during the reign of the Kakatiya rulers. Another wall built to protect the fort after the earthen wall and the moat was a fortified inner stone wall of about 0.75 miles (1.21 km) in diameter. It was the central part of the Kakatiya capital, called the fort. This wall was built with dressed huge granite stone blocks of very large dimensions. These stones were not in any regular shape but were closely fitted without using any type of mortar. During the reign of Rudrama Devi, the height of the wall was increased to 29 feet (8.8 m) from the structure which had been built earlier by Ganapatideva. The wall has been fortified with 45 large rectangular bastions, which measure 40–60 feet (12–18 m) on a side; they extend beyond the face of the wall up to the waters of the moat. There are also 18 stone steps laid over a gradual slope built on the inner slopes of the earthen wall as an access to the ramparts. These steps permitted the soldiers quick and easy access in times of war from any location in the fort, including the top of the ramparts. The king, Prataparudra II, had used these steps to go to the rampart in 1318, clad in a qaba to bow towards Delhi, in honor of the Sultan.

The third ring of fortification is in the form of an earthen wall of 12.5 kilometres (7.8 mi) diameter that encloses the present city of Warangal.

=== Ruins in the fort ===
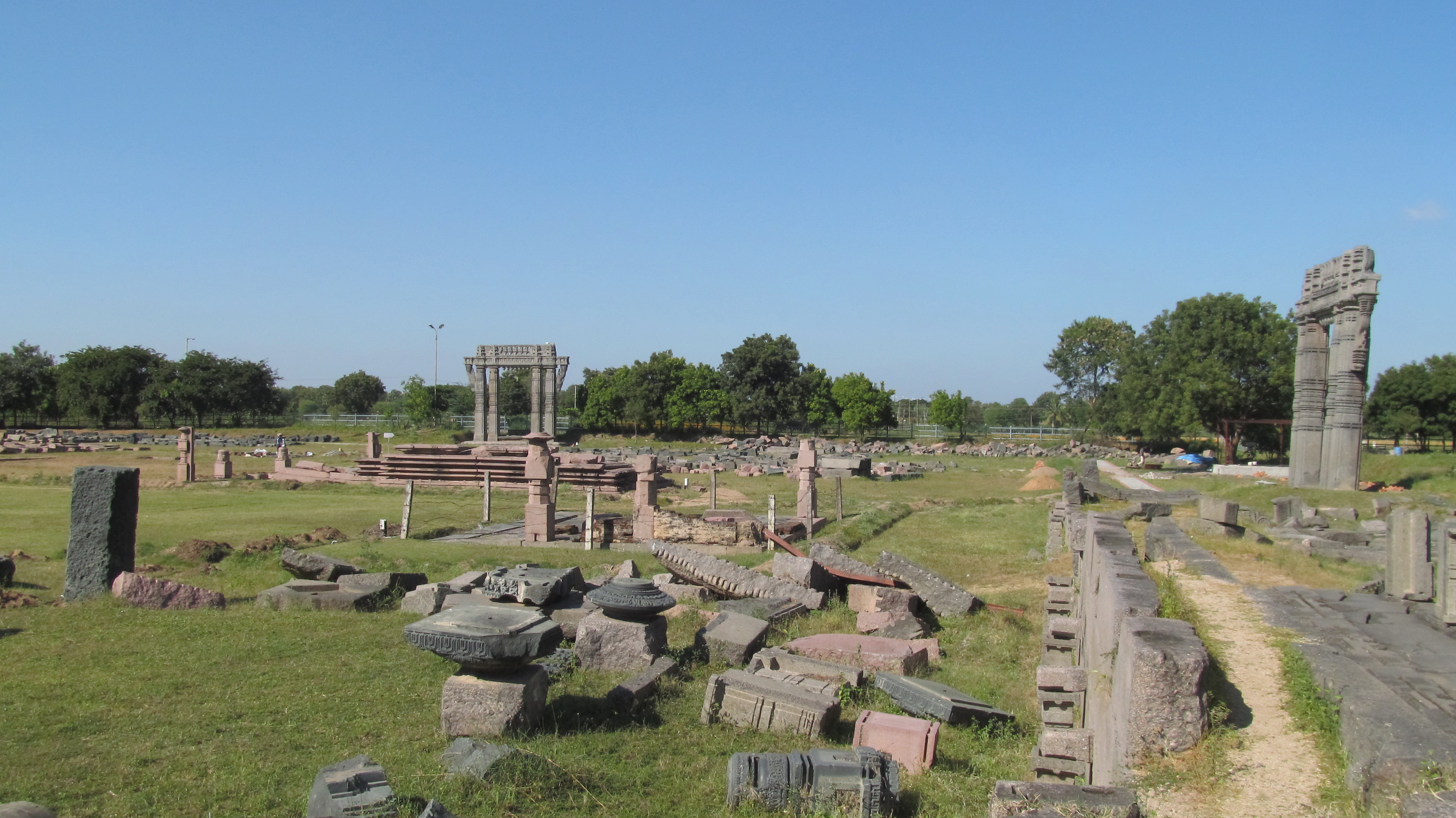
Ruins within the main fort complex

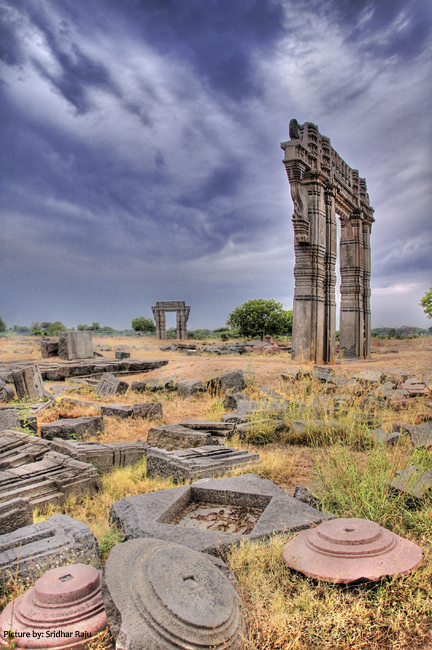
The Warangal gates within the fort complex

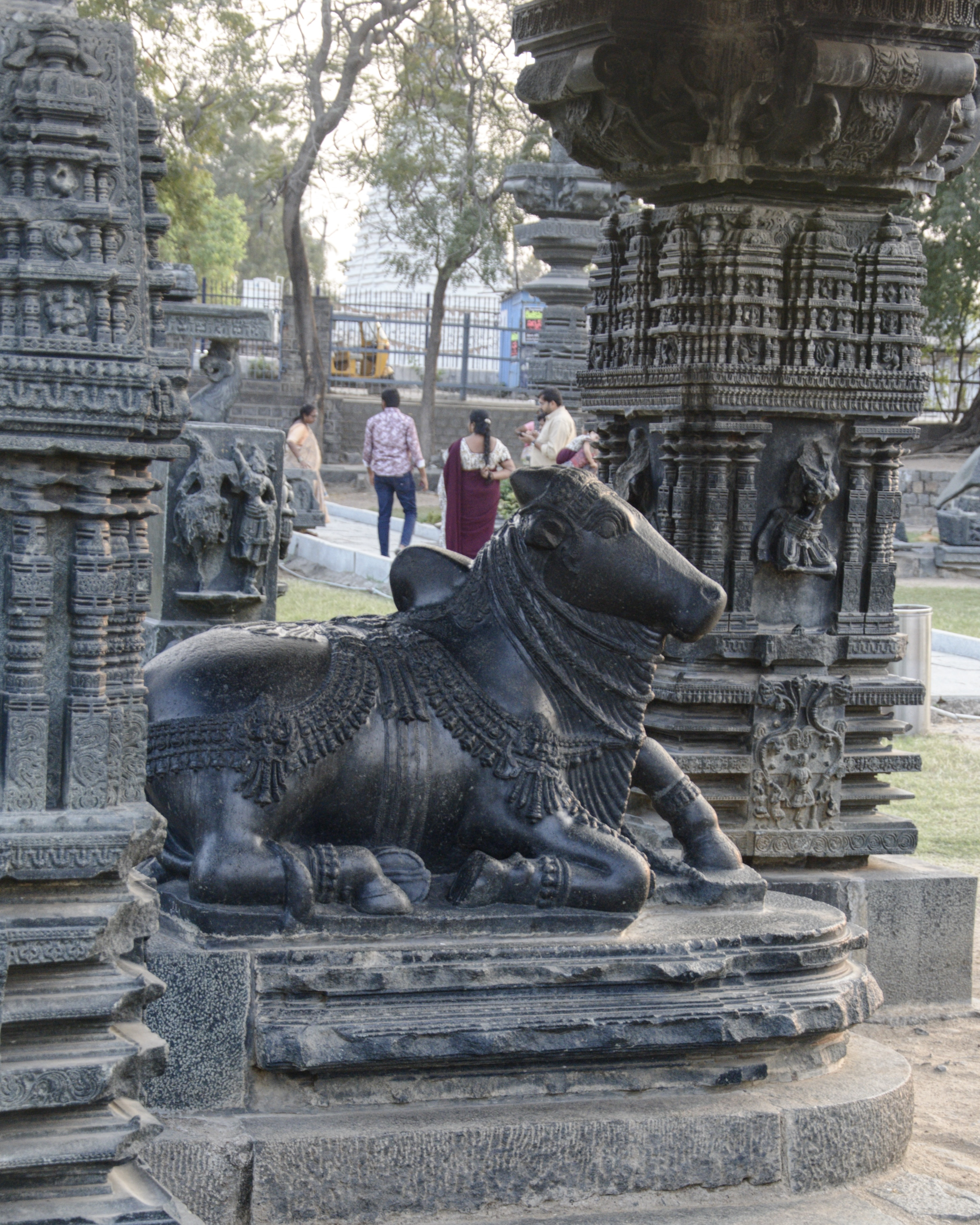
Nandi at Swayambhu Temple, Warangal Fort

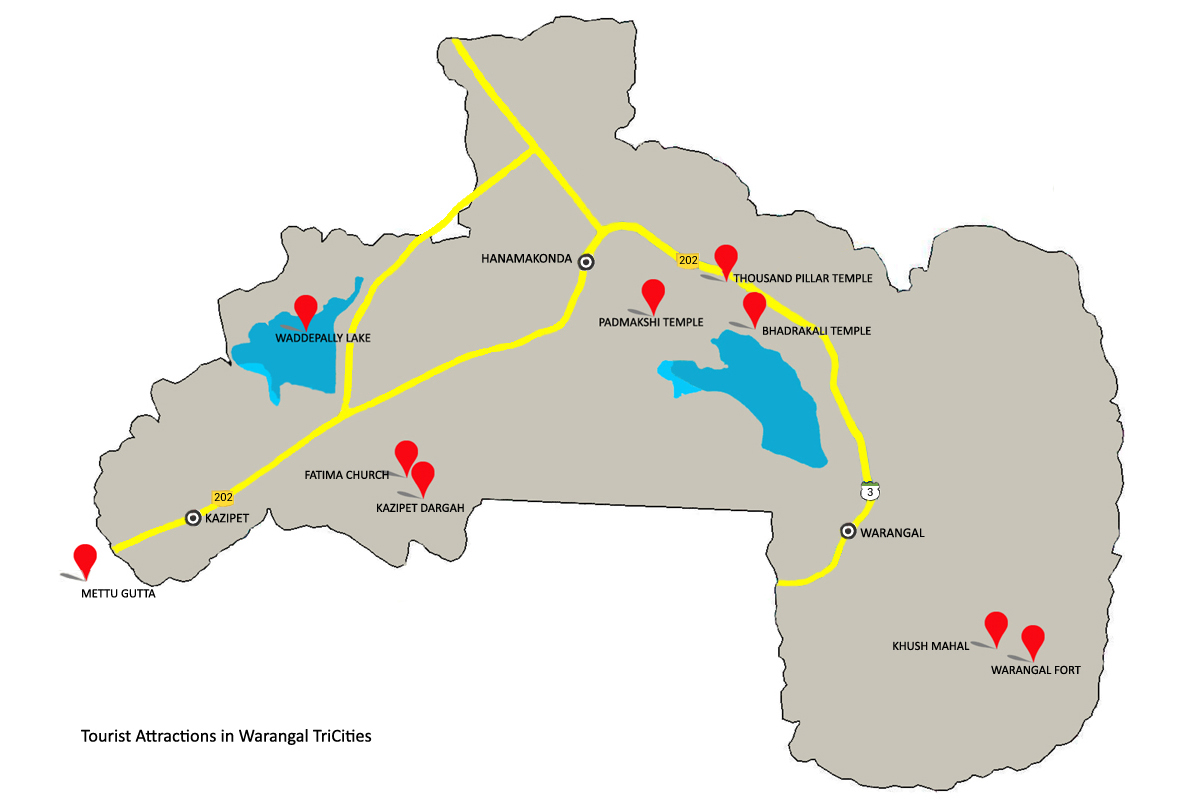
A few Tourist attraction spots in Warangal Tri-Cities.

The area within the fort has an axial road laid in an east–west direction where there is now some human habitation. The central part of the fort has been identified as the archaeological zone where the ruins of a great Shiva temple are now seen with only the freestanding "entrance portals" or gates on the four sides. Each gate has twin pillars with angled brackets over which lies the huge lintel; the height of this gate is 10 metres (33 ft). The gates have extensive intricate carvings of "lotus buds, looped garlands, mythical animals, and birds with foliated tails". The carvings do not include any religious symbols, which is said to be the reason for its preserved condition and not getting destroyed by the Muslim invaders. Of the four gateways (local name charkamou), the northern and southern ends are 480 feet (150 m) apart. The eastern and western gates are a distance of 433 feet (132 m) from each other.

While the Shiva temple had been completely destroyed, there are many ruins of "wall slabs, brackets and ceiling panels", some of which are exhibited now in an outdoor museum. There are still some standing pillars ("temple spoilia") that the Bahmani Sultanate (14th-16th century) earlier used to build a mosque, which remained incomplete.

The original deity of the temple was a linga with the four faces of Shiva, which is now deified in a separate shrine to the south of the fort complex, where regular worship is offered. Archaeological excavations in the area have also unearthed many small shrines, built in a series, deified with a votive linga.

Seen within 150 metres (490 ft) of the archaeological zone is the Kush Mahal, which is a public hall built in the 14th century by the Delhi Sultans, who had captured the fort. The mahal, which is rectangular in shape, is built with huge sloping walls, sliced by six arched openings on each of its sides. There was once a timber roof over this mahal, supported by five transverse arches built of stones. There are approach steps on the northeast corner that provide access to the top of the structure, which has scenic views of the entire fort complex.

Within the southern quarter of the archaeological zone is a big water tank. Inside this tank is a distinctive natural rock formation that protrudes above the water surface. This was called as Orugallu (meaning: single rock) in Telugu, giving the name "Warangal" to the fort. A small temple has been built over this rock. There are many other temples and water ponds in the entire fort complex. There are also three large granaries close to the south gate of the fort.

Just outside the central fort, the earthen wall, which is the second circle of the fort complex in the northwestern part, has within it the Linga gudi ('gudi' means "shrine"), which consists of three small temples; but the linga deities have been removed and are seen scattered nearby.

There are many inscriptions on the ruins of the wall of the main temple recording the gift of a Kakatiya king, on pillars, on a stone outside the fort, and at many more places, all in Telugu.

== Ruling dynasties ==
- Kakatiyas
- Musunuri Nayakas

== See also ==
- Golconda Fort
- Bhongir Fort
- Telangana
- List of Monuments of National Importance in Telangana
- Papadu
- Rachakonda fort

== Bibliography ==
- Cousens, Henry (1900). Lists of antiquarian remains in His Highness the Nizam's territories. Office of the superintendent of government printing, India.
- Eaton, Richard M. (2005). A Social History of the Deccan, 1300-1761: Eight Indian Lives. Cambridge University Press. ISBN 978-0-521-25484-7.
- Michell, George (2013). Southern India: A Guide to Monuments Sites & Museums. Roli Books Private Limited. ISBN 978-81-7436-903-1.
- Puri, B.N.; Das, M.N. (2003). A Comprehensive History of India: Comprehensive history of medieval India. Sterling Publishers Pvt. Ltd. ISBN 978-81-207-2508-9.
- Sardar, Marika (2007). Golconda Through Time: A Mirror of the Evolving Deccan. ISBN 978-0-549-10119-2.
- Satt(h), Raj Mohan; Satt(h)u, Raja Mohan (2004). Environmental Administration. APH Publishing. ISBN 978-81-7648-783-2.
- Texas, Austin Cynthia Talbot Assistant Professor of History and Asian Studies University of (2001). Precolonial India in Practice : Society, Region, and Identity in Medieval Andhra: Society, Region, and Identity in Medieval Andhra. Oxford University Press, USA. ISBN 978-0-19-803123-9.
