= Tomb of Khan-i Jahan Tilangani =

Coordinates: 28°35′24″N 77°14′32″E

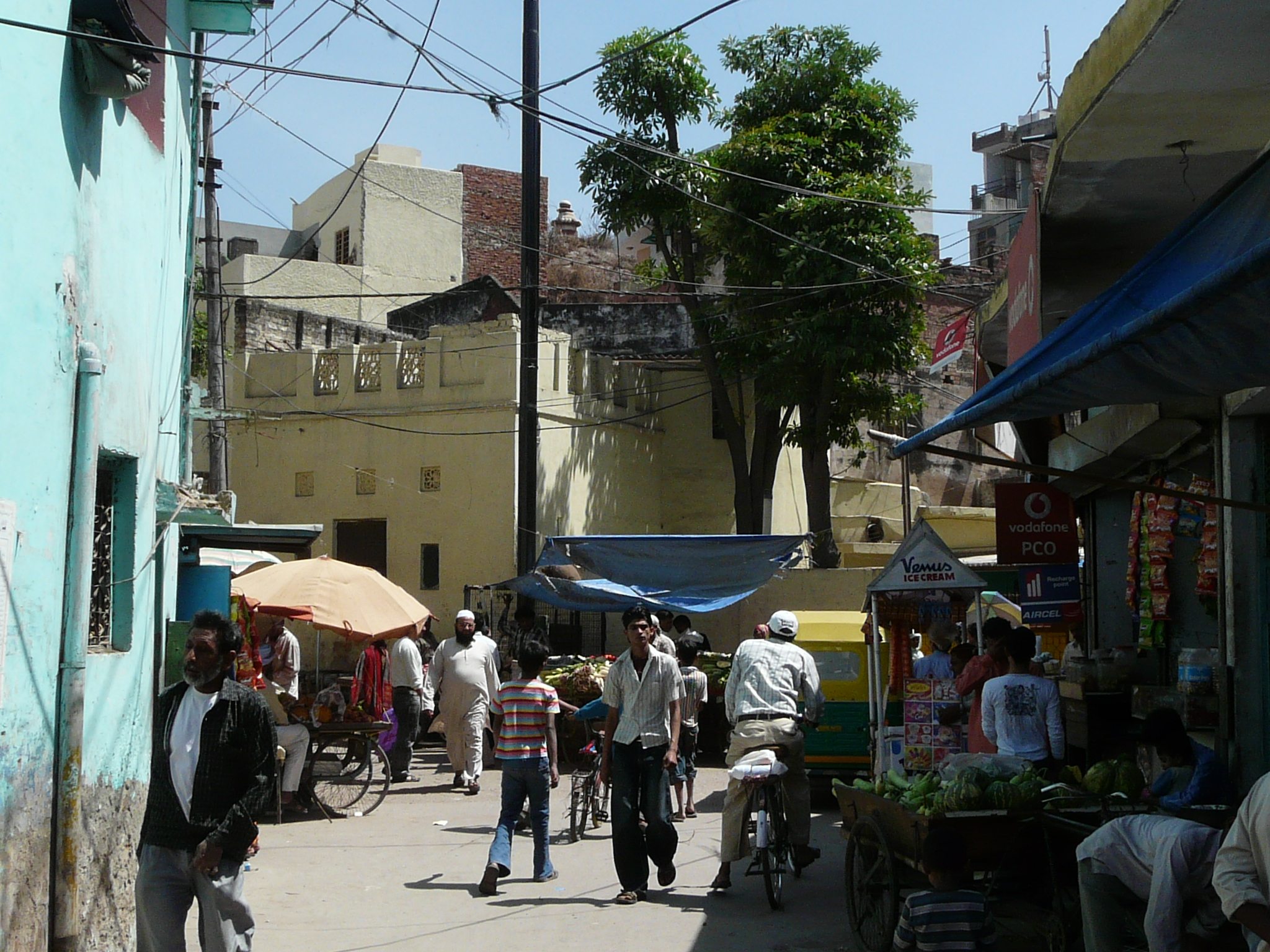

General information
- Location: Nizamuddin West, Delhi
- Country: India

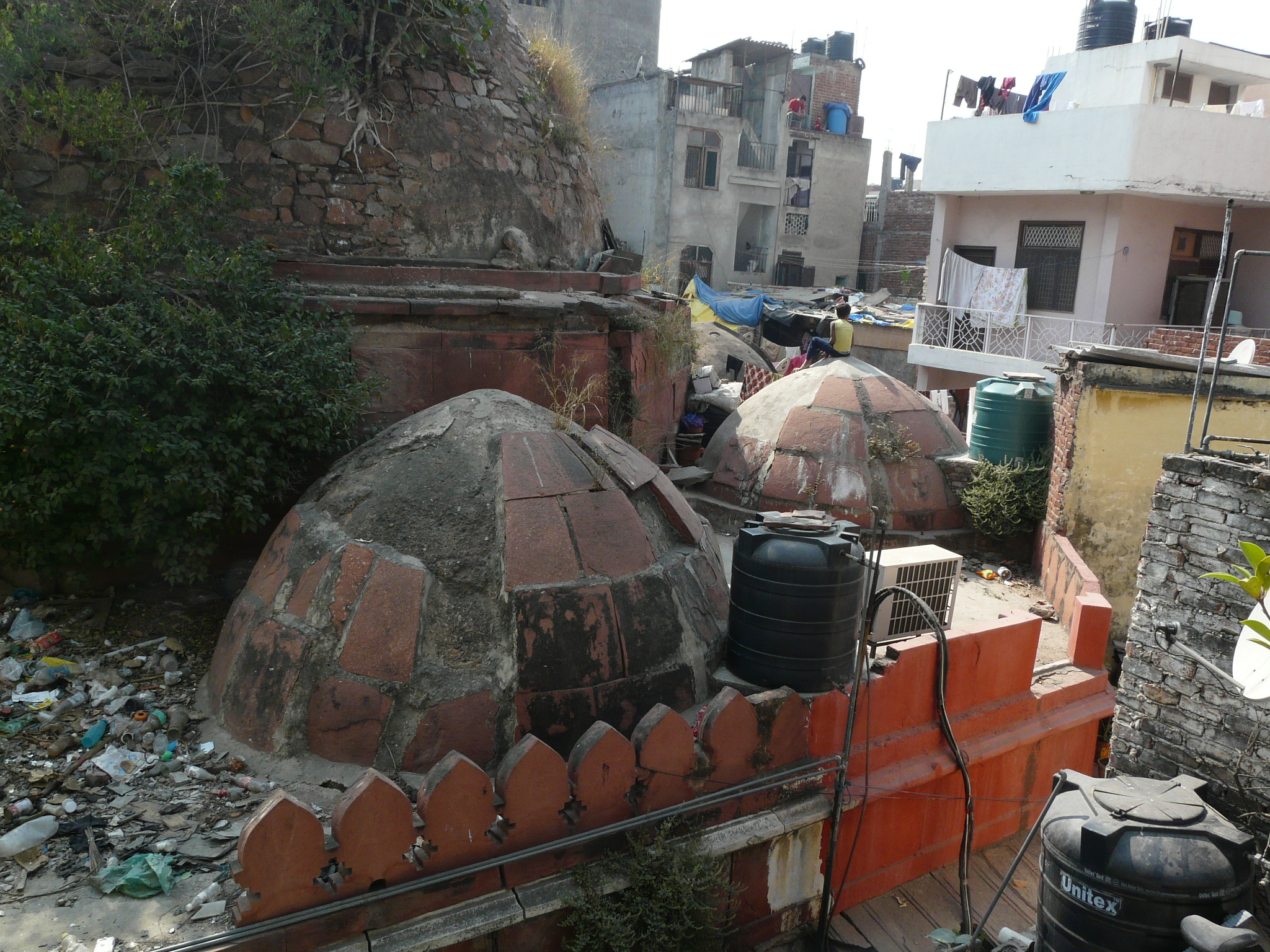
Domes of Tilangani's tomb

Tomb of Khan-i Jahan Tilangani is the tomb of Malik Maqbul Tilangani, known by his title Khan-i Jahan. The tomb is located at Nizamuddin West in Delhi.

== History ==
The tomb was completed in 1388. It was the earliest octagonal tomb in modern-day India. The only octagonal tomb predating it in the Indian subcontinent is the tomb of Shah Rukn-e-Alam.

The tomb is heavily encroached.

== Description ==
The tomb is the first octagonal tomb in India. Percy Brown states that while it might have been a purely Indian invention, it is also possible that its octagonal design was inspired by the Dome of the Rock in Jerusalem. This style was later adopted and further perfected by the Sayyid, Lodi, and Sur dynasties.

The tomb consists of an octagonal burial chamber, with an octagonal verandah surrounding it. The verandah has three arched entrances on each side. A small dome is provided for all eight sides of the verandah.

It is surmounted by a dome which is crowned by an amalaka.
