= Kalan Masjid =

Mosque in Delhi, India

Kalan Mosque
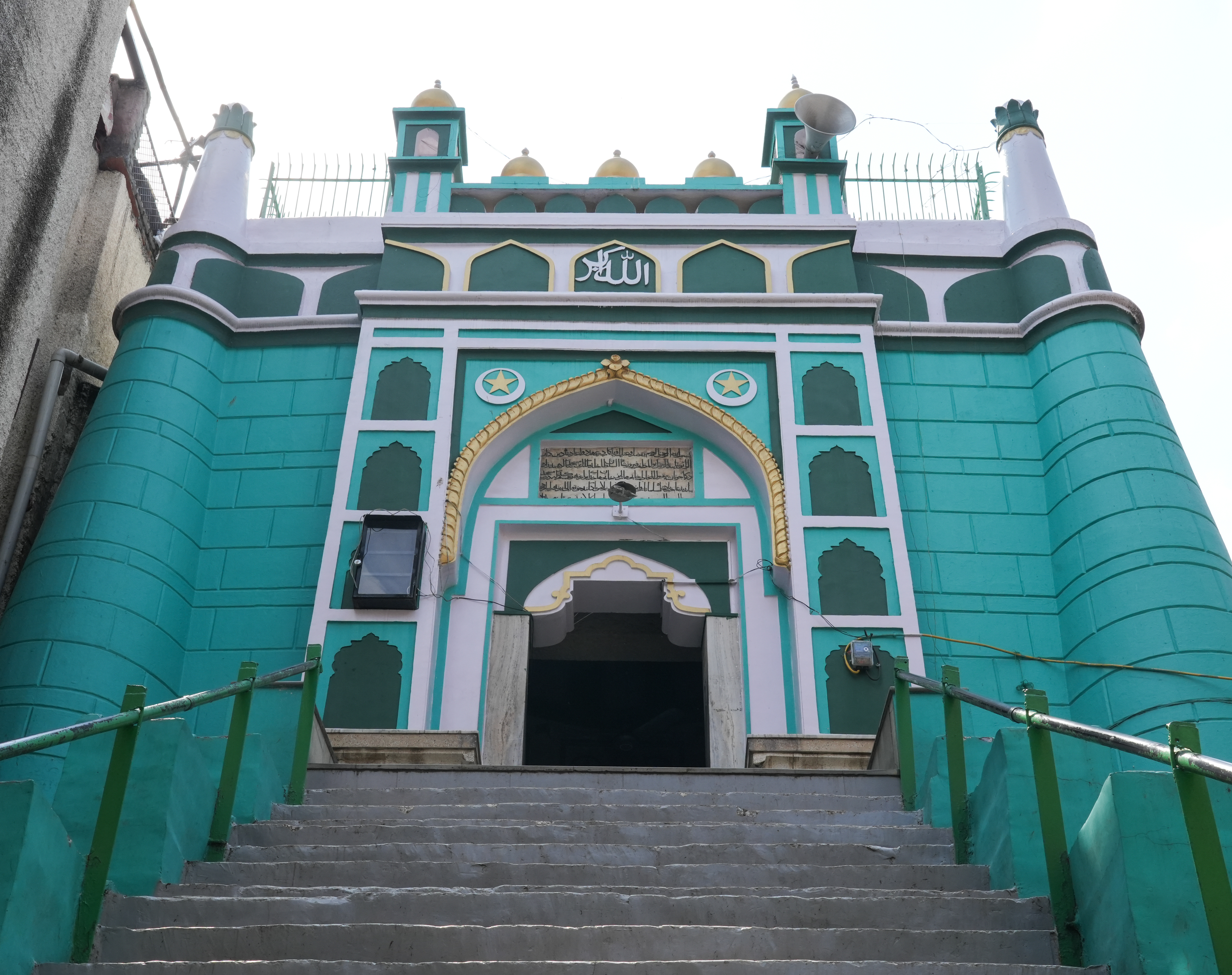
- Kalan Masjid

- Location of the mosque in Central Delhi

Religion
- Affiliation: Islam
- Ecclesiastical or organizational status: Mosque
- Status: Active

Location
- Location: Old Delhi, Central Delhi, Delhi NCT
- Country: India
- Interactive map of Kalan Mosque
- Coordinates: 28°38′42″N 77°13′51″E

Architecture
- Type: Mosque architecture
- Completed: 1387

Specifications
- Length: 43 m (140 ft)
- Width: 37 m (120 ft)
- Height (max): 20 m (66 ft)
- Dome: Eight (maybe more)
- Minaret: Two (truncated)
- Materials: Sandstone

The Kalan Masjid, or Kalan Mosque, is a 14th-century mosque in Old Delhi, India. It is one of the seven mosques built by Khan-i-Jahan Tilangani.

== Etymology ==
The mosque is titled Kalan Masjid, meaning chief mosque. It is also known as Kali Masjid, or black mosque, although this may also be a corruption of the word Kalan.

== History ==
The mosque was built in 1387 by Khan-i-Jahan Maqbul Tilangani during the reign of Firuz Shah Tughlaq.

== Architecture ==
The mosque is built out of sandstone. It is an oblong structure, measuring 43 metres (140 ft) long and 37 metres (120 ft) wide. It has two stories, with a maximum height of 20 metres (66 ft).

A flight of steps leads to the doorway on the first story through which the mosque is to be entered. The doorway is surmounted by a low dome, which is flanked by two conical columns. Over the doorway is a marble slab on which there is an inscription in the Naskh script. The inscription describes the date of completion of the mosque, and that it was constructed by Khan Jahan during the reign of Firuz Shah.

The mosque has a square plan, and is divided into four quadrants.

== Gallery ==
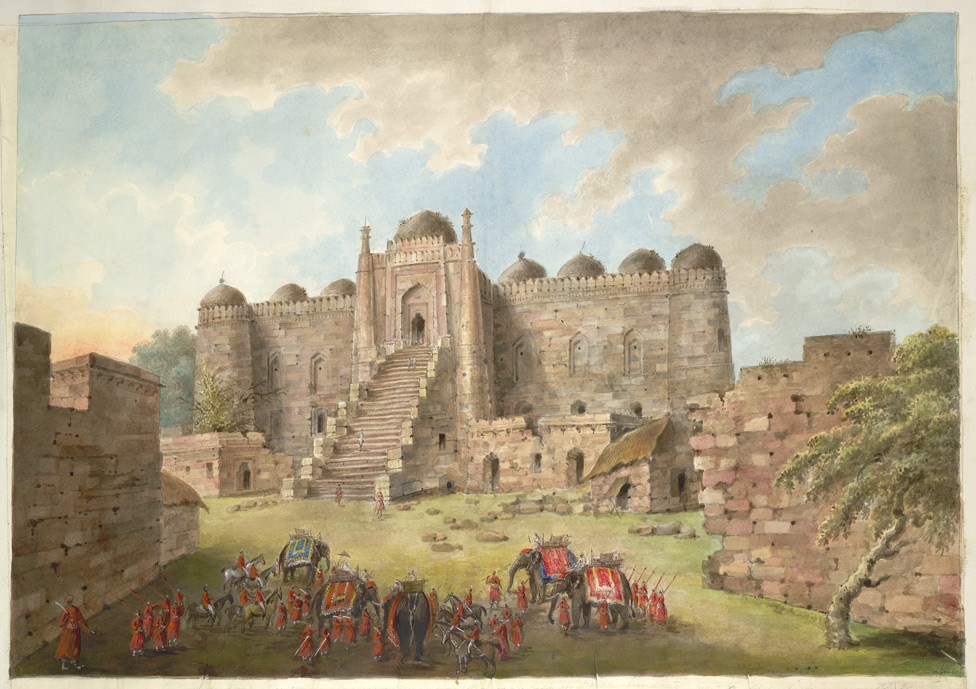
The mosque in a painting by Seeta Ram

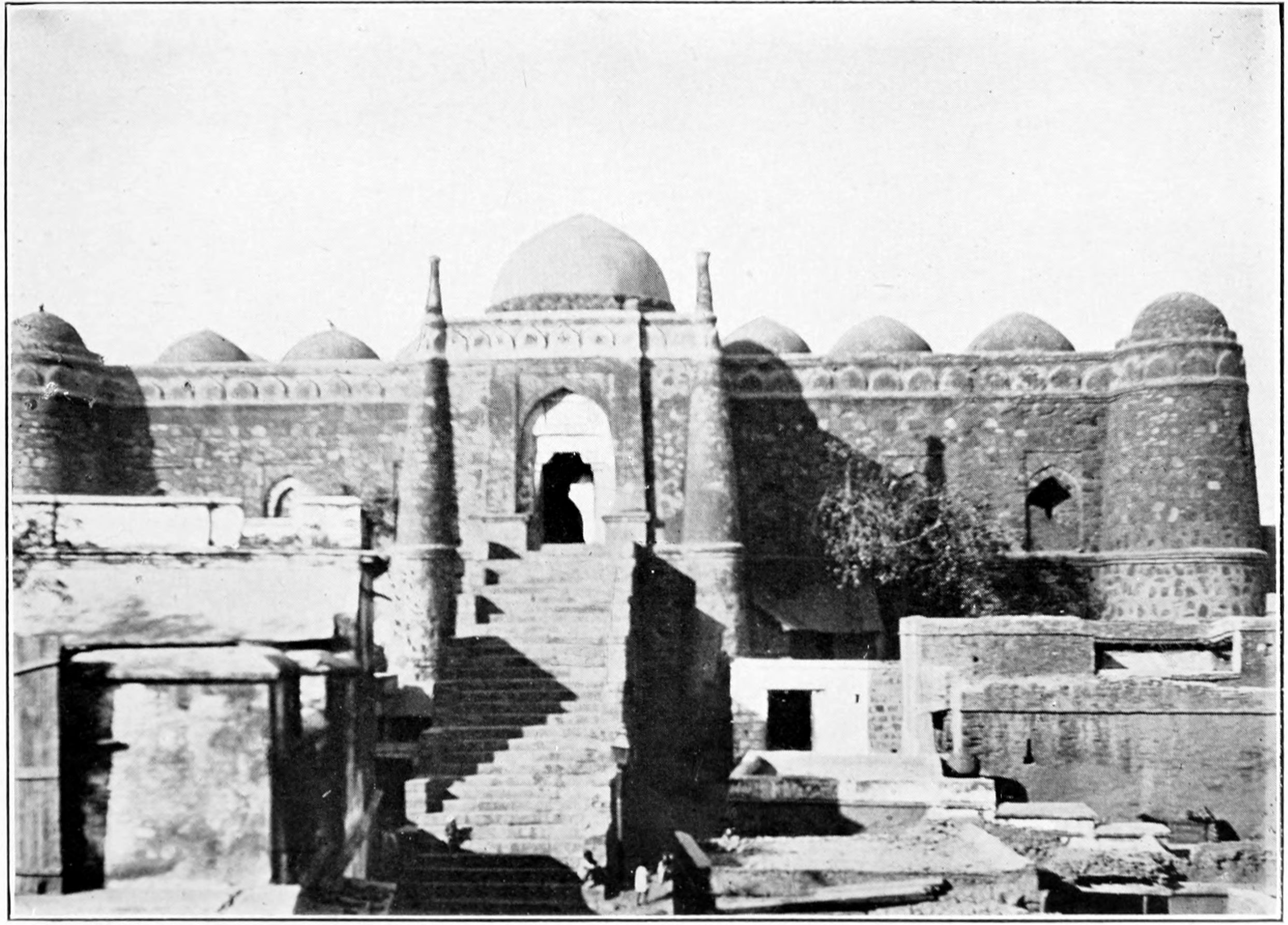
The mosque in 1906,
from The Seven Cities of Delhi

== See also ==
{{stack|

- Islam in India
- List of mosques in India
