= Chandupatla =

- Village
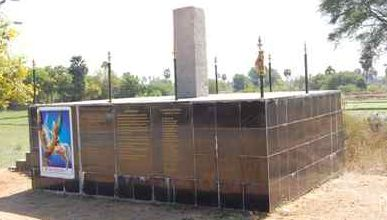
- Inscription on the death of Rani Rudrama Devi in Chandupalta-1289 AD

- Location within Telangana Location within India
- Coordinates: 17°30′17″N 78°58′52″E
- Country: India
- State: Telangana
- District: Nalgonda
- Mandal: Nakrekal

Government
  - Type: Gram panchayat

Area
  - Total: 10.26 km^{2} (3.96 sq mi)
- Elevation: 193 m (633 ft)

Population (2011)
  - Total: 3,927

Languages
  - Official: Telugu
- Time zone: UTC+5:30 (IST)
- PIN: 508211
- STD code: 08682

Chandupatla is a village in Nakrekal mandal, Nalgonda district, Telangana state, India. It is notable for an inscription related to Rudrama Devi, a famous queen regnant of the Kakatiya dynasty. As of the year 2011, the village had a total population of 3,927.

== Geography ==
Chandupatla is located in the southern part of Nalgonda district, at an average elevation of 193 meters above the sea level. It covers an area of 1026 hectares.

== Demographics ==
According to the 2011 census of India, there were 3,927 residents in Chandupatla. Its literacy rate was 60.05%, with 1,445 of the male residents and 913 of the female residents being literate.
