= Bollikunta =

- Neighbourhood
- Location in Telangana, India Bollikunta (India)
- Coordinates: 17.891°N 79.615°E
- Country: India
- State: Telangana
- Metro: Warangal

Government
  - Body: Greater Warangal Municipal Corporation

Population (2011)
  - Total: 4,116

Languages
- Time zone: UTC+5:30 (IST)
- PIN: 506005
- Area code: 578321

Bollikunta is neighbourhood of Warangal, in the state of Telangana in India. It is located just to the south of the Warangal Airport in Mamnoor, on the east side of State Highway 240. The Vaagdevi College of Engineering is located on the west side.

A mother in the village was the focus of a February 2014 profile in The New York Times about the issue of farmers' suicides in India.
