= Prataparudra =

Maharaja of the Kakatiya Kingdom from 1289 to 1323

- Maharaja

Kakatiya Monarch
- Reign: 1289 – 9 November 1323
- Predecessor: Rudramadevi
- Born: 1244 or 1254
- Died: 1323; Narmada River, Delhi Sultanate
- Spouse: Visalakshi; Lakshmidevi
- Dynasty: Kakatiya
- Father: Mahadeva
- Mother: Mummadamma

Pratāparudra (r. c. 1289–1323) was the last monarch of the Kakatiya dynasty of India. He ruled the eastern part of Deccan, with his capital at Warangal.

Prataparudra succeeded his grandmother Rudrama as the Kakatiya monarch. In the first half of his reign, he subjugated the insubordinate chiefs who had asserted their independence during his grandmother's reign. He also achieved successes against the neighbouring kingdoms of the Yadavas (Seunas), the Pandyas and Kampili.

In 1310, he faced an invasion from the Delhi Sultanate, and agreed to become a tributary of the Delhi Sultan Alauddin Khalji. After Alauddin's death, he stopped making tribute payments, but a 1318 invasion forced him to pay tribute to Alauddin's son Mubarak Shah. After the end of the Khalji dynasty, he again withheld the tribute payments to Delhi. This prompted the new Sultan Ghiyath al-Din Tughluq to order a 1323 invasion that ended the Kakatiya dynasty and resulted in the annexation of their kingdom to the Delhi Sultanate.

== Early life ==
According to Telugu-rajula-charitramu, Prataparudra was born in the Shaka year 1166 (1244 CE); this may be a mistake for Shaka 1176 (1254 CE). The earliest record to mention him is his grandmother Rudrama's 1261 CE Malkapuram inscription.

His mother Mummadamma was the eldest daughter of Rudrama and the Chalukya prince Virabhadra. His father Mahadeva was a Kakatiya prince. Prataparudra succeeded Rudramadevi on the Kakatiya throne.

Earlier historians believed that Rudramadevi ruled until 1295, because some records before this year name Prataparudra as Kumara-Rudra (Prince Rudra). However, a later inscription discovered at Chandupatla confirms that Rudramadevi died some days before 27 November 1289, the date of the inscription. Moreover, some records before 1295 (such as the 1292 Inkirala inscription) call Prataparudra a Maharaja. It appears that Prataparudra continued to be called Kumara-Rudra for some years after ascending the throne, because this was a familiar usage. Prataparudra’s chief queen was Visalakshi; Pratapa-charitra, a late legendary account of the Kakatiya kings refers twice to this queen. Lakshmidevi was another queen of this king mentioned in an inscription found in the village Yelgedu in the present-day Karimnagar district.

Prataparudra had been associated with his grandmother's military campaigns and administration, which helped him gain the acceptance of the nobles after ascending the throne.

== Subjugation of Ambadeva and his allies ==
During the reign of Prataparudra's predecessor Rudramadevi, Ambadeva – a Kayastha feudatory of the Kakatiyas – had set up an independent kingdom with support from the neighbouring Yadava (Seuna) and Pandya dynasties. Soon after ascending the throne, Prataparudra reorganized the Kakatiya military, and launched expeditions against Ambadeva and his allies.

Prataparudra first sent his army to Vikramasimhapura (modern Nellore), which was ruled by Ambadeva's appointee Manuma Gandagopala. The attack was led by Adidamu Mallu, an officer (dakshinabhuja-danda) of the Kakatiya commander-in-chief (sakala-senadhipati) Somayadula Rudradeva. Manuma was defeated and killed in battle. He was succeeded by Madhurantaka Pottapi Choda Ranganatha (alias Raja-Gandagopala), whose rule is attested by inscriptions dated to 1290 (Shaka 1212). Prataparudra formed an alliance with Raja-Gandagopala.

In 1291–92 (Shaka 1213), Prataparudra sent an army to Tripurantakam. The army was led by Manuma Gannaya (son of Kolani Soma-mantri), and Annayadeva (Prataparudra's cousin and son of Induluri Peda Gannaya-mantri). Epigraphic evidence suggests that as a result of this attack, Ambadeva had to retreat southwards to the Mulikinadu region: his last inscription at Tripurantakam is dated Shaka 1213, and an inscription of Induluri Annayadeva is dated two months later in the same year. The Kayasthas seem to have ruled Mulikanadu independently for the next few years, as the inscriptions of Ambadeva's son Tripurari II do not mention Prataparudra as his overlord. In 1309, Prataparudra sent an expedition to Mulikinadu, which resulted in the end of the Kayastha rule. The region was annexed to the Kakatiya kingdom, and Somaya Nayaka was made its governor.

Prataparudra also sent an expedition against the Yadavas (Seunas), who had supported Ambadeva. The Telugu Chola Manuma Gandagopala (not to be confused with Manuma Gandagopala of Nellore) participated in this expedition. His Narasaraopet inscription calls him "the wild fire to the bamboo-like army of the Seunas". The 1294 Raichur Fort inscription of the Kakatiya feudatory Gona Vithala states that Vithala captured the Adavani and Tumbala forts in the present-day Bellary district, and Manuva and Haluva in the Raichur Doab. Finally, he took control of the city of Raichur, where he erected strong fortifications to protect the city.

Meanwhile, Raja-Gandagopala betrayed Prataparudra, and formed an alliance with the Pandyas. To punish him, Prataparudra sent a second expedition to Nellore, led by the Telugu Chola chief Manuma Gandagopala. The Kakatiya army won the ensuing battle: a 1297–98 (Shaka 1219) inscription of Manuma states that he drank "the ocean of the Dravida (Pandya) army" like a massive fire.

== Alauddin Khalji's invasion ==
In the early 13th century, the Deccan region was an immensely wealthy area, having been shielded from the foreign Muslim armies that had ransacked and razed northern India. In 1296, Alauddin Khalji, a general of the Delhi Sultanate, had successfully raided Devagiri, the capital of the Yadavas, who were the western neighbours of the Kakatiyas. Alauddin forced the Yadava monarch Ramachandra to become his tributary, and shortly after, used the war booty from Devagiri to usurp the throne of Delhi. The huge plunder obtained from Devagiri prompted Alauddin to plan an invasion of the Kakatiya capital Warangal in 1301, but the untimely death of his general Ulugh Khan made him defer this plan.

In late 1302 or early 1303, Alauddin sent his generals Malik Juna and Malik Chajju on an invasion of Warangal. By the time the Khalji army returned to Delhi, it had suffered severe losses in men and material. The Delhi Sultanate chronicles do not mention how and where the army suffered these losses. According to the 14th century chronicler Ziauddin Barani, the army had managed to reach Warangal, but decided to return because the rainy season had started. The 16th century chronicler Firishta states that this army was ordered to reach Warangal via Bengal. Historian Kishori Saran Lal theorizes that Delhi met with a humiliating defeat in Bengal, which was ruled by Shamsuddin Firoz; an embarrassed Alauddin decided to keep this failure a secret, which explains Barani's narrative. On the other hand, P. V. P. Sastry believes that a Kakatiya army repulsed the invaders at Upparapalli. His theory is based on Velugoṭivāri-Vamṣavāli, which states that two Kakatiya commanders — the Velama chief Vena and Potugamti Maili — destroyed the pride of the Turushkas (Turkics, that is, the Khaljis).

Around 1308, Alauddin sent his general Malik Kafur to invade Devagiri, after Ramachandra discontinued the tribute payments promised in 1296. Malik Kafur returned to Delhi after defeating the Yadavas, and forcing Ramachandra to become Alauddin's vassal. Prataparudra determined that the Delhi Sultanate forces were likely to invade Deccan again, and therefore, he reorganized his defence set-up. He is said to have raised an army of 900,000 archers, 20,000 horses and 100 elephants. Despite these preparations, when Malik Kafur invaded Warangal in 1310, Prataparudra was forced to negotiate a truce. He surrendered a substantial amount of wealth to the invaders, and agreed to become a tributary to Alauddin. Subsequently, he maintained friendly relations with Alauddin.

== Southern campaigns ==
Taking advantage of the Khalji invasion, the Kakatiya vassals at the frontier provinces asserted independence. When Mallideva, the Vaidumba chief of Gandikota, attempted to overthrow his suzerainty, Prataparudra sent his general Juttaya Lemka Gomkya Reddi to Gandikota. Reddi defeated Mallideva, and was appointed governor of Gandikota and its surrounding areas.

Another insubordinate chief was Ranganatha, the Telugu Chola ruler of Nellore. In 1311, Prataparudra's overlord Alauddin asked him to contribute forces to Malik Kafur's invasion of the Pandya kingdom. On his way to the Pandya territory, Prataparudra visited Ranganatha's territory, and suppressed the rebellion.

By the mid-1310s, the Pandya kingdom had been weakened by a war of succession between the brothers Sundara Pandya and Vira Pandya, and the Muslim raids. After Alauddin's death in 1316, the Hoysala king Ballala launched a fresh invasion of the Pandya territory. According to a Daksharama inscription, the Kakatiya commander Peda Rudra defeated Ballala and his allies — Shambhuvaraya of Padaividu and Yadavaraya of Chandragiri. After this victory, he occupied Kanchi in the Pandya territory.

When the Pandya forces tried to evict the Kakatiyas from Kanchi, Prataparudra himself led an army against them, supported by his generals Muppidinayaka, Recherla Era Dacha, Manavira, and Devarinayaka. The Pandyas were forced to retreat after a battle near Kanchi. The Kakatiya general Devarinayaka penetrated further into the Pandya territory, and defeated Vira Pandya and his ally Malayala Tiruvadi Ravivarman Kulashekhara. The Kakatiyas then reinstated Sundara Pandya at Viradhavala. To commemorate his victory, Devarinayaka granted the Salakalavidu village to Sriranganatha in 1317.

== Mubarak Shah's invasion ==
After Alauddin's death, Malik Kafur installed Alauddin's minor son Shihab-ud-din Omar as a puppet monarch on the throne of Delhi. However, Alauddin's elder son Qutubuddin Mubarak Shah soon killed Kafur, and became the Sultan. By this time, Ramachandra's son-in-law Harapaladeva had rebelled at Devagiri, and Prataparudra had stopped sending tribute payments to the Khaljis. Mubarak Shah suppressed the rebellion at Devagiri, and then sent his general Khusrau Khan to Warangal in 1318. Prataparudra did not offer much resistance, and made a tribute payment in the form of 100 elephants, 12,000 horses, gold, and precious stones. In addition, he agreed to cede five districts of his kingdom to Mubarak Shah.

== War against Kampili ==
Meanwhile, the Hoysala king Ballala invaded the Kampili kingdom located at the juncture of the Kakatiya, Hoysala and the Delhi Sultanate (formerly Yadava) territories. According to the Kannada language text Kumara-Ramanasangatya, the Kampili prince Kumara Rama sought Prataparudra's assistance against Ballala. Prataparudra refused to help him and his father Kampiliraya, leading to a rivalry between the two kingdoms. Sometime later, Kumara Rama forcibly occupied the western part of the Kakatiya kingdom, and Prataparudra responded by waging a war against Kampili.

According to Srinatha's Telugu language text Bhimesvara-Puranamu, Prataparudra's commander Prolaya Annaya destroyed the Kampili capital Kummata. Kotikanti Raghava, a son of the Aravidu chief Tata Pinnama (who was probably a Kakatiya feudatory), is credited with having defeated Kampiliraya. These accounts suggest that Prataparudra won battles against Kampili, but he does not appear to have gained any tangible benefit from these victories.

== Tughluq invasion ==
Meanwhile, in Delhi, Khusrau Khan murdered Mubarak Shah, and usurped the throne of Delhi in 1320. He was dethroned by a group of rival nobles, and Ghiyath al-Din Tughluq became the new Sultan. According to the 16th century chronicler Firishta, Prataparudra had stopped sending tributes to Delhi by this time. Therefore, Ghiyath al-Din sent his son Ulugh Khan (later Muhammad bin Tughluq) to Warangal in 1323. Prataparudra put up a strong resistance this time, but ultimately retreated to his capital Warangal. Ulugh Khan besieged Warangal, while another part of the Delhi army led by Abu-Riza besieged Kotagiri.

During the siege, a false rumour about Ghiyath al-Din's death in Delhi caused a rebellion in Ulugh Khan's army, and he had to retreat from Warangal. The Kakatiya army plundered his camp, and pursued him till Kotagiri, where Abu Riza came to his rescue. Ulugh Khan ultimately retreated to Devagiri.

Prataparudra believed that he had achieved a decisive victory, and let his guard down. However, Ghiyath al-Din sent reinforcements to Devagiri, and instructed Ulugh Khan to launch a fresh attack on Warangal. Within four months, Ulugh Khan besieged the fort again, and this time, Prataparudra had to surrender.

== Death ==
Ulugh Khan sent an imprisoned Prataparudra and his family members to Delhi, escorted by a contingent led by the Tughluq lieutenants Qadir Khan and Khawaja Haji. The Tughluq court historian Shams-i-Siraj Arif simply states that Prataparudra died en route to Delhi. The 1330 Vilasa inscription of Musunuri Prolaya Nayaka states that Prataparudra died on the banks of the Somodbhava (Narmada) river, while being taken to Delhi as a captive. The 1423 Kaluvacheru inscription of the Reddi queen Anitalli mentions that he "departed to the world of Gods by his own desire." When taken together, these accounts suggest that Prataparudra committed suicide on the banks of the Narmada River while being taken to Delhi as a prisoner.
