= Kalakada =

Kalakada Kallukada, kallukunda (old name)
- Village
- Interactive map of Kalakada
- Location in Andhra Pradesh, India
- Coordinates: 13.8167°N 78.8000°E
- Country: India
- State: Andhra Pradesh
- District: Annamayya
- Mandal: Kalakada

Languages
  - Official: Telugu Urdu Tamil English
- Time zone: UTC+5:30 (IST)
- PIN: 517 236
- Telephone code: 08586
- Vehicle registration: AP 03, AP 39
- Nearest Cities: Pileru, Rayachoti
- Assembly Constituency: Pileru
- Lok Sabha Constituency: Rajampeta

Kalakada is a village in Annamayya district of the Indian state of Andhra Pradesh. It is the mandal headquarters of Kalakada mandal.papulation (2001) -Total 34,279 - males 17,398 - females. 16,881 literacy (2001) - total 56.08% - males 70.12% -females 41.64%
