= Muthukur =

- Village
- Interactive map of Muthukur
- Location in Andhra Pradesh, India Muthukur (India)
- Coordinates: 14°17′22″N 80°05′43″E
- Country: India
- State: Andhra Pradesh
- District: Nellore District

Government
  - Type: Panchayati raj (India)
  - Body: Gram panchayat
- Elevation: 4 m (13 ft)

Population (2011)
  - Total: 14,333

Languages
  - Official: Telugu
- Time zone: UTC+5:30 (IST)
- Vehicle registration: AP

Muthukur or Muttukuru is a village and a Mandal in Nellore district in the state of Andhra Pradesh in India.

== Geography ==
Muthukur is located at 14.2667°N 80.1000°E. It has an average elevation of 4 meters (16 feet).

== Panchayats ==
There are 21 panchayats in Muthukur mandal.

Muthukur Mandal Panchayat List: Balija Palem (village) Brahmadevam (village and panchayat) Dammayapalem (village and panchayat) Doruvulapem (village and panchayat) Duvvuruvaripalem (village and panchayat) Epuru (village and panchayat) Krishnapatnam (village and panchayat) Malluru (village and panchayat) Mamidipudi (village and panchayat) Musunurivaripalem (village and panchayat) Muthukur Town(Panchayat and Headquarters) Narikelapalli (village and panchayat) Nelaturu (village and panchayat) Pantapalem (village and panchayat) Pathurivari Kandrigi (village and panchayat) Pidatha Polour (village and panchayat) Polamrajugunta (village and panchayat) Pottempadu (village and panchayat) Pynapuram (village and panchayat) Tallapudi (village and panchayat) Valluru (village and panchayat) Varkavipudi (village and panchayat).Largest port in India Krishnapatnam located in Muthukur mandal only.
