= Siege of Warangal (1323) =

1323 siege in India

Date	13 March – 9 November 1323 (7 months, 3 weeks and 6 days)
Location	Warangal
Result	Delhi Sultanate victory
Territorial changes	Kakatiya dynasty annexed into the Delhi Sultanate

Belligerents
Kakatiya dynasty Supported by: Eastern Ganga dynasty	Delhi Sultanate

Commanders and leaders
Prataparudra (surrendered) (POW); Supported by: Bhanudeva II	Muhammad bin Tughluq

Delhi, Devagiri and Warangal in present-day India

In 1323, the Delhi Sultanate ruler Ghiyath al-Din Tughluq sent an army led by his son Ulugh Khan (later Muhammad bin Tughluq) to the Kakatiya capital Warangal, after the Kakatiya ruler Prataparudra refused to make tribute payments. Ulugh Khan's first siege of Warangal failed because of a rebellion resulting from a false rumour about Ghiyath al-Din's death in Delhi. Ulugh Khan had to retreat to Devagiri, but he returned to Warangal within four months, this time with reinforcements from Delhi. Prataparudra was defeated and taken captive, resulting in the end of the Kakatiya dynasty.

== Background ==
The Hindu Kakatiya kingdom, ruled by Prataparudra, was located in the eastern part of the Deccan region of southern India. The Muslim Khalji rulers of Delhi Sultanate had invaded the Kakatiya capital Warangal twice, in 1310 and 1318, forcing Prataparudra to become their tributary. Amid the political instability resulting from the end of the Khalji dynasty in 1320, Prataparudra stopped sending tributes to Delhi. Subsequently, Ghiyath al-Din Tughluq ascended the throne of Delhi, and sent his son Ulugh Khan (later Muhammad bin Tughluq) against Prataparudra to extract tribute payments. Prataparudra initially put up a strong resistance against the invaders, but ultimately retreated to his capital Warangal. Ulugh Khan besieged Warangal, while another Delhi contingent led by Abu-Riza besieged Kotagiri.

== First attack ==
Ulugh Khan's first siege was unsuccessful: the Muslim chroniclers blame a man named Ubaid for this failure, although their accounts vary about the exact cause. According to the Deccan chronicler Isami (c. 1349), Ulugh Khan plundered the Kakatiya territory on his way to Warangal. At Warangal, he besieged the fort for six months, but could not breach it. When Ghiyath al-Din expressed his displeasure at the siege operations in letters from Delhi, Ulugh Khan consulted his astrologer Ubaid. The astrologer declared that the fort would fall on a specific day, and offered to be executed if his prediction failed. However, the defenders did not show any sign of submission on that day, and therefore, Ubaid devised a plan to save himself. He spread a false rumour that Ghiyath al-Din had died in Delhi, and that Khalji sympathisers had revolted in Delhi. He also told the soldiers that Ulugh Khan had decided to kill the chief amirs of the Delhi army in Warangal, because he suspected them of being Khalji sympathisers. This caused a panic in the camp, and a section of the army rebelled and retreated from Warangal.

According to the Delhi chronicler Ziauddin Barani, at one point, Ulugh Khan was on the verge of winning, and Prataparudra offered to negotiate a truce. However, Ulugh Khan refused the offer, as he was determined to annex Warangal. Meanwhile, the postal system connecting Ulugh Khan's army to Delhi broke down. Amid this confusion, Ulugh Khan's associates Ubaid and Shaikh Zada-i-Dimashqi spread the false rumour. The rest of Barani's account is similar to that of Isami's.

According to the Moroccan traveler Ibn Battuta, it was Ulugh Khan who asked Ubaid to spread the false rumour, because he wanted to seize the throne of Delhi from his father. He had hoped that the army chiefs would support him after learning about Ghiyath al-Din's death. This plan backfired, when the army chiefs rebelled and planned to kill him instead. He managed to flee to Delhi with help from the loyal chief Malik Timur. Once in Delhi, Ulugh Khan falsely accused Ubaid and other amirs of the conspiracy. Ghiyath al-Din accepted these allegations, and punished the amirs. The veracity of Ibn Battuta's account is doubtful, because it contradicts the Indian chronicles, and because he wrote it from memory several years later, after returning to Morocco.

Whatever the case, it is known that Ulugh Khan's first attack on Warangal failed. Taking advantage of the situation, the Kakatiya army stormed the invaders' camp, and plundered it. Ulugh Khan had to flee, and the Kakatiya army pursued him till Kotagiri, where Abu Riza came to his rescue. He ultimately retreated to Devagiri.

Prataparudra's victory made him complacent: he believed that he had achieved a decisive victory, and that the Delhi army would not return to Warangal. He organized a feast to celebrate his victory, and exhausted the fort's granary. He also allowed his soldiers to take leave from military service, and return to agriculture and farming.

== Second attack ==
When Ghiyath al-Din learned of the siege's failure, he severely punished the rebels. He then sent reinforcements to Devagiri, and instructed Ulugh Khan to launch a fresh attack on Warangal. Within four months of his retreat, Ulugh Khan marched to Telangana again, this time capturing enemy forts en route to Warangal. First, he captured a place called Badrikot (possibly modern Bidar). Then, he marched to Bodhan, and captured it after a 3-4 day siege. The defending governor and his companions embraced Islam to save their lives.

Next, Ulugh Khan marched to Warangal, where he first besieged and captured the outer mud fort, and then surrounded the inner citadel. The siege lasted for five months, which suggests that the defenders put up a strong resistance. The scarcity of provisions in the fort may have forced Prataparudra to surrender. After he opened the gates of the citadel, the invaders ransacked and plundered the houses and destroyed the public buildings.

Ulugh Khan sent Prataparudra and his family members to Delhi, escorted by a contingent led by his lieutenants Qadir Khan and Khawaja Haji. Prataparudra appears to have killed himself on the banks of the Narmada River on the way to Delhi.

== See also ==
- Siege of Kangra Fort
