= Siege of Warangal (1318) =

1318 siege by Delhi Sultanate

- Part of Sieges of Delhi Sultanate
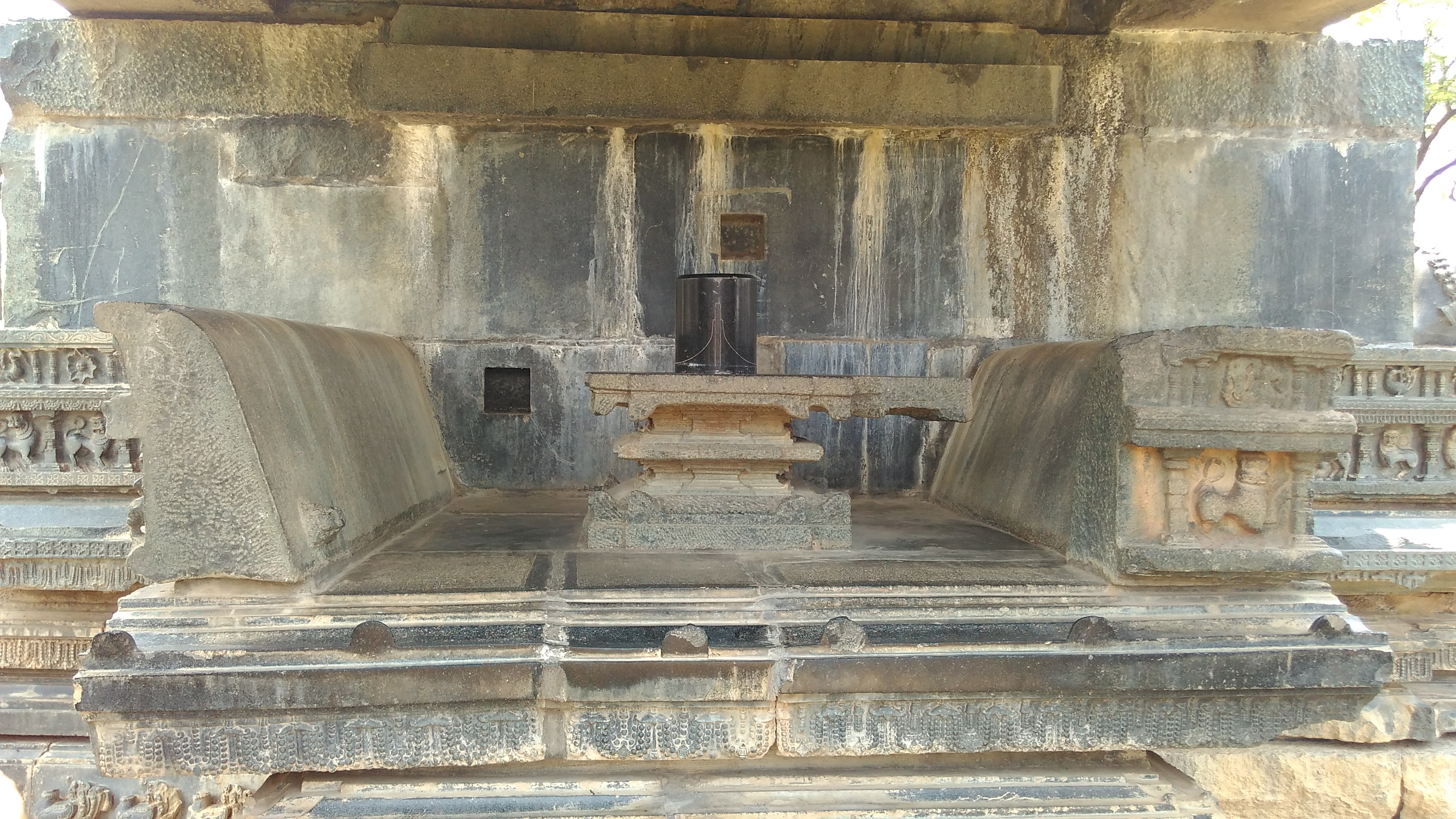
- View of the Shiva Lingam at the Warangal Fort complex
Date	1318
Location	Warangal
Result	Delhi Sultanate victory

Belligerents
Delhi Sultanate	Kakatiya dynasty

Commanders and leaders
Khusrau Khan; Ghazi Kamil; Tamar	Prataparudra (surrendered); Diwar Mehta

Casualties and losses
- Prataparudra surrendered over 100 elephants, 12,000 horses, and treasures to the invaders

In 1318, the Delhi Sultanate ruler Qutbuddin Mubarak Shah sent an army to subjugate the Kakatiya ruler Prataparudra who had stopped making tribute payments to Delhi. The invading army, led by Khusrau Khan and other generals, besieged the Kakatiya capital Warangal. Prataparudra negotiated a truce after a brief siege, agreeing to resume payment of tribute to Delhi.

== Background ==
The Kakatiya kingdom, with its capital at Warangal, had been subdued by the forces of Qutbuddin's father Alauddin Khalji in 1310. However, the Kakatiya ruler Prataparudra had stopped making tribute payments to Delhi. Therefore, Mubarak Shah sent an army to subjugate him. The army was led by Khusrau Khan, Khwaja Haji (who had served as Alauddin's minister of war), and Malik Qutlugh (amir-i shikar).

== The siege ==
After reaching the vicinity of Warangal, Khusrau Khan surveyed the city from the Hanamkonda hill. His initial attack forced the defending garrison to retreat inside the Warangal Fort. The invaders then besieged the fort, and set fire to the fort's gate. The fire seems to have failed to achieve the desired results, as the invaders next pitched their tents around the fort. The Delhi army deployed highly advanced military technology by contemporary standards, including several siege engines.

At night, Prataparudra's general Diwar Mehta launched an attack on the Delhi camp. However, the attack was repulsed by Ghazi Kamil (governor of Awadh) and Tamar (governor of Chanderi). The Delhi soldiers then climbed up to a tower of the outer fort wall, and captured Prataparudra's minister Anil Mehta in a skirmish. Khusrau Khan spared the captive's life. During the first half of the next day, the invaders captured the outer mud-fort. The invaders then decided to construct a pasheb under the supervision of Malik Ambar and Shihab Arb. At this time, Prataparudra sent his messengers to negotiate peace.

== Prataparudra's surrender ==
As part of the truce negotiations, Prataparudra surrendered over 100 elephants, 12,000 horses, and treasures to the invaders. Khusrau Khan also demanded an annual tribute payment of 60 gold bricks and cessation of five districts (Badarkot, Kailas, Basudan, Elor, and Kobar) from Prataparudra. After negotiations, this demand was reduced to 40 gold bricks and cessation of Badarkot. As a sign of Prataparudra's surrender, the canopy (chatr), baton (durbash), and banner given to him by Alauddin were taken back, and brought back as a gift from Mubarak Shah. Prataparudra paid obeisance to the royal canopy from the ramparts of his fort on three successive mornings.

After subduing the Kakatiyas, Khusrau Khan marched to Ellora near Daulatabad Fort, where Mubarak Shah had been residing for a month. The rest of the army joined him on the banks of the Narmada River on his way back to Delhi.
