= Pachala Someswara Temple =

- పచ్చల సోమేశ్వరాలయం
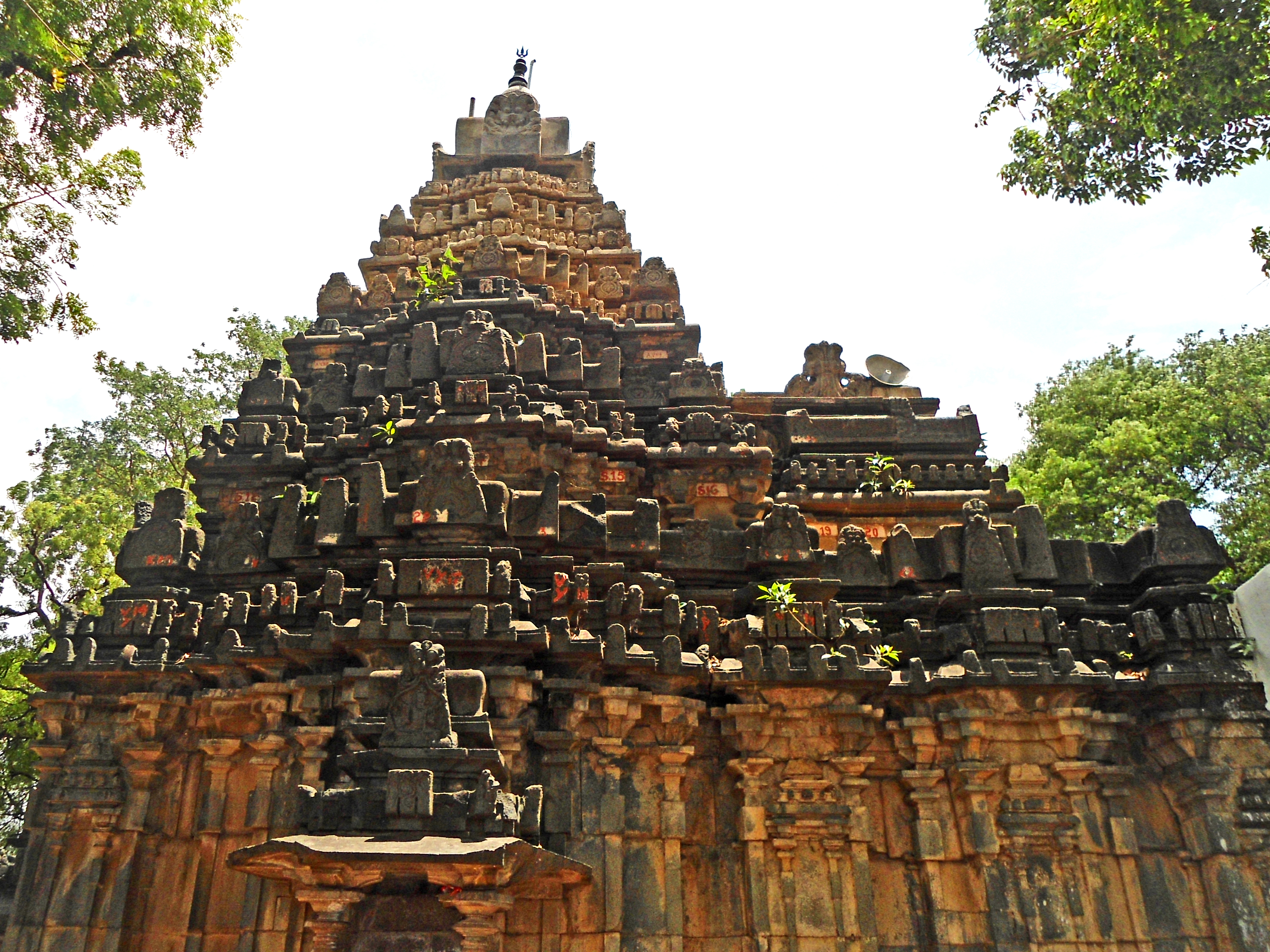
- Pachala Someswara Temple at Panagal

- Location in Telangana Pachala Someswara Temple (India)

Religion
- Affiliation: Hinduism
- District: Nalgonda
- Deity: Shiva

Location
- Location: Panagal
- State: Telangana
- Country: India
- Coordinates: 17.07967°N 79.28820°E

Architecture
- Completed: 11th to 12th century CE

Pachala Someswara Temple is a Shaivite Hindu temple located in Panagal, Nalgonda district, Telangana, India. It is a popular pilgrimage site particularly during Maha Shivaratri. The idol of the deity at the temple is carved out of green onyx, which is the source of the temple's name—Pacha meaning "green" in Telugu. The temple is in close proximity to Chaya Someswara Temple, another Shaivite shrine in Panagal. The temple dates back to the 11th or 12th centuries CE and was probably built during the rule of Kunduru Chodas and Prataparudra I of Kakatiya dynasty who governed the Panagal region.

== Location ==
The temple is located at a distance of nearly 4 km from the district headquarters of Nalgonda in Panagal, Nalgonda district. The temple is in close proximity (around 1 km) to the Chaya Someswara Temple.

== Architecture ==
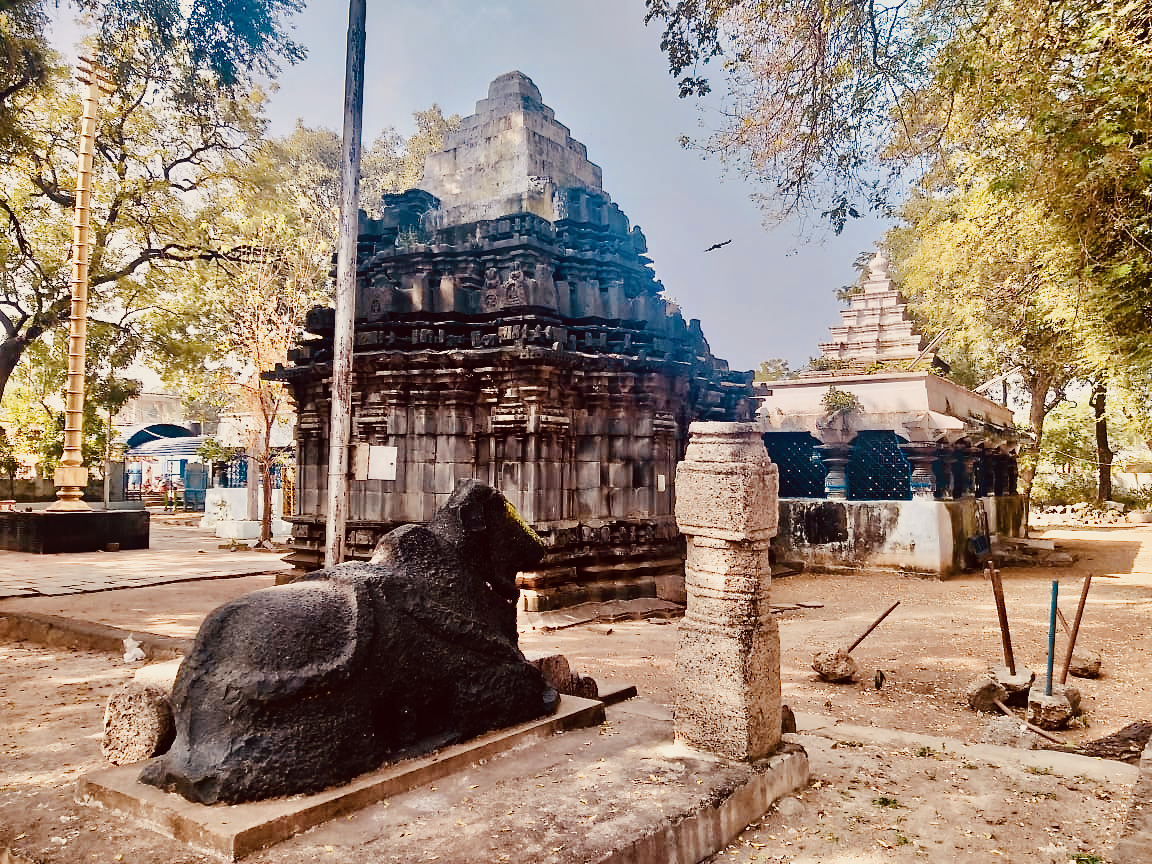
The Pachala Someswara temple consists of four shrines on a square plan, a shared mandapam and 70 intricately carved pillars.

Based on the inscriptional evidence and the architectural style, the Pachala Someswara temple is dated to the 11th-12th century CE. It was probably built during the rule of Kanduru Chodas and Prataparudra I of Kakatiya dynasty who ruled over the Panagal region. The ground plan of the temple is distinctly different from other shrines in Telangana. It has four shrines in total and three of the shrines are situated on the western side, while one is on the eastern side with a common and large rectangular mandapam. The main shrine is dedicated to Shiva in the form of a Linga made of green onyx stone (Pacha in Telugu) which gives the temple its name Pachala Someswara. The temple has a pillared hall, at the end of which is a Nandi statue facing the presiding deity Pachala Someswara (Siva linga).

The temple features 70 pillars, each adorned with intricate carvings that depicts stories of Vishnu and Shiva. Scenes from the Ramayana and Mahabharata are exquisitely carved onto the pillars and the walls of the temple. One of the temple legends tells of a very big and brilliant emerald that once rested beneath the shining lingam. According to the legend, this emerald was stolen during the numerous Islamic raids in the region.

== Museum ==
Panagal Museum, an archaeological museum, was established on the premises of the Pachala Someswara temple in February 1982. Spread over three acres, it has a collection of around 640 art objects and antiquities. The museum also has statues and sculptures of various Hindu deities, some of which dates back to the Andhra Ikshvaku dynasty of 3rd century CE.

== Gallery ==
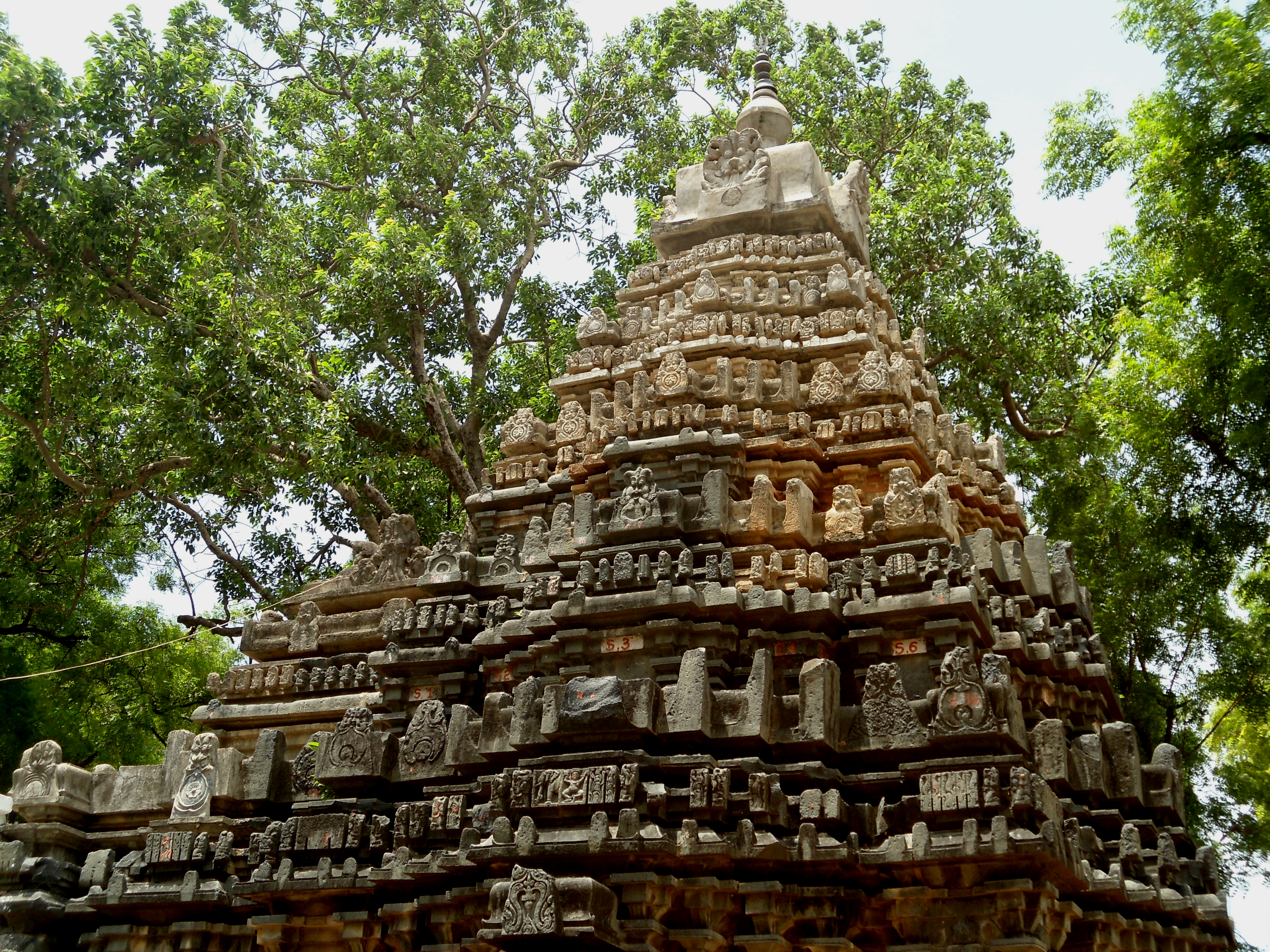
Pachala Someswara temple

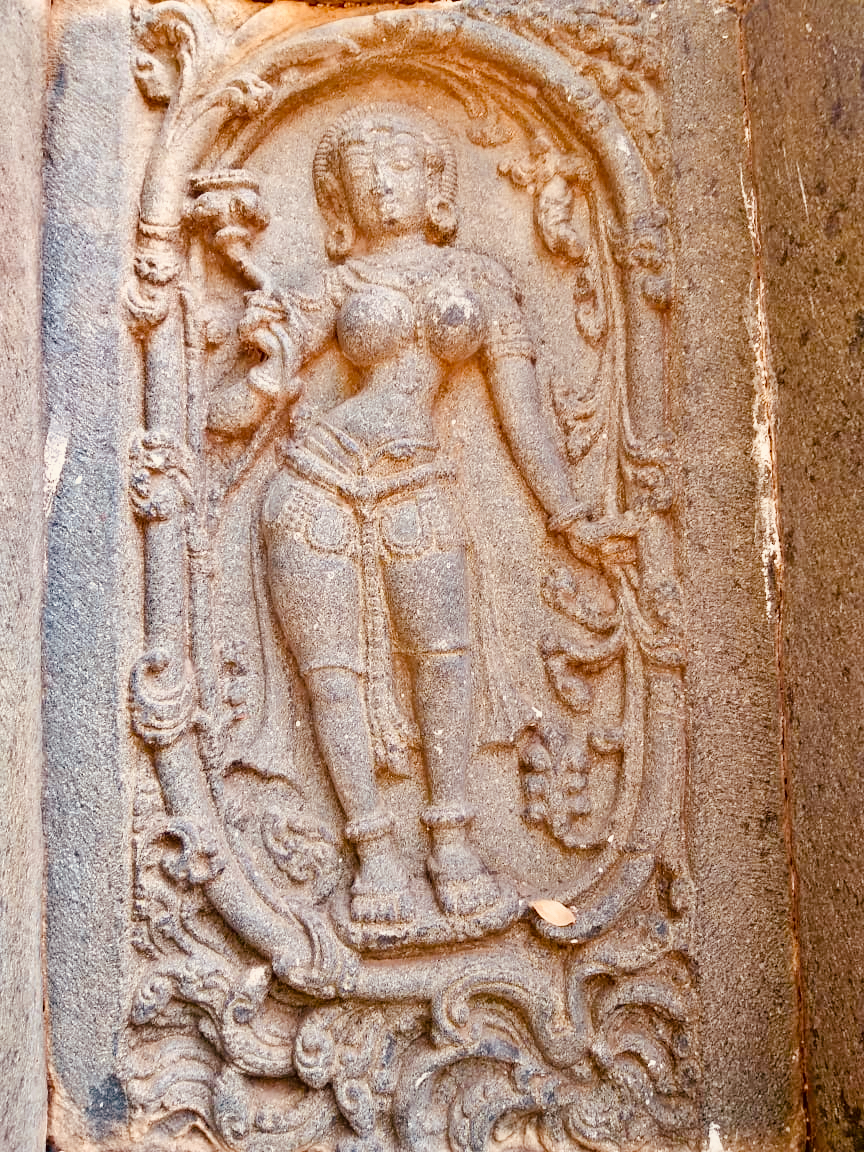
A complete upper relief on outer temple walls, lower reliefs are damaged

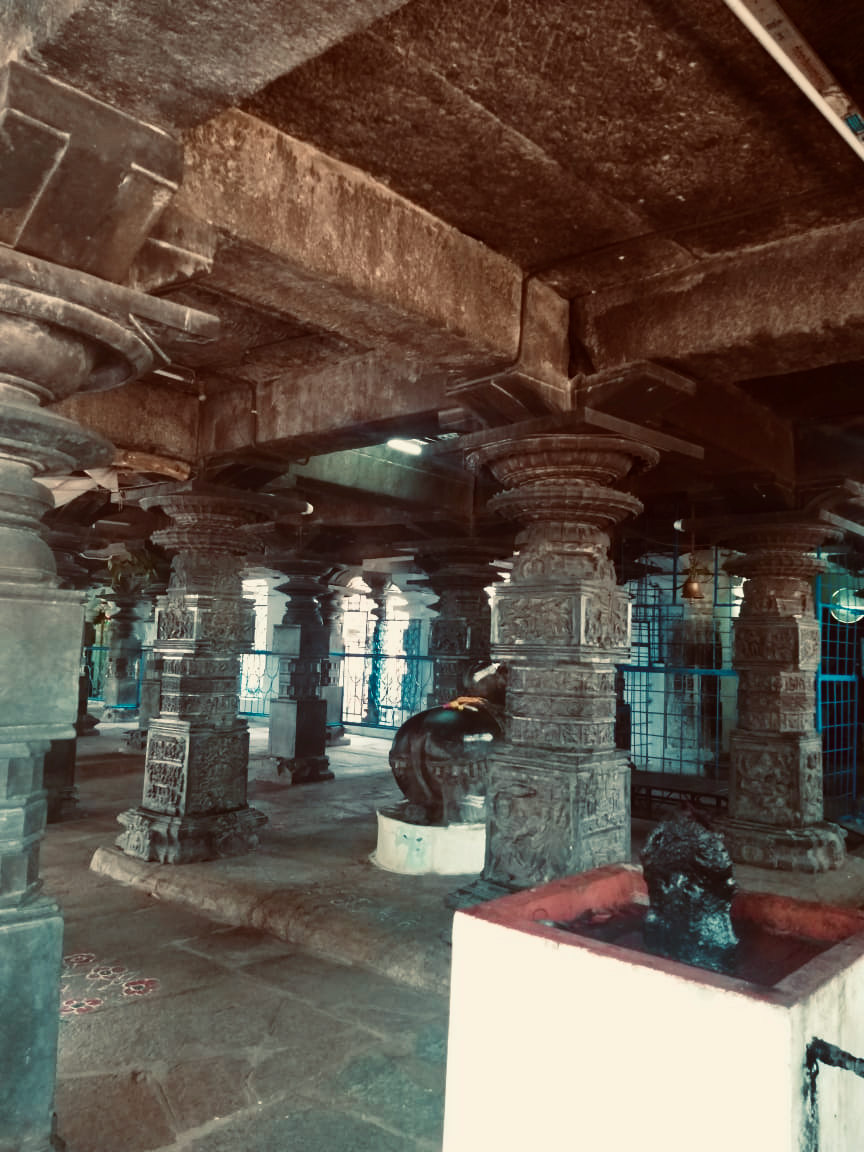
The temple has four shrines that share a mandapa with 70 pillars, many depicting Vedic and Puranic legends

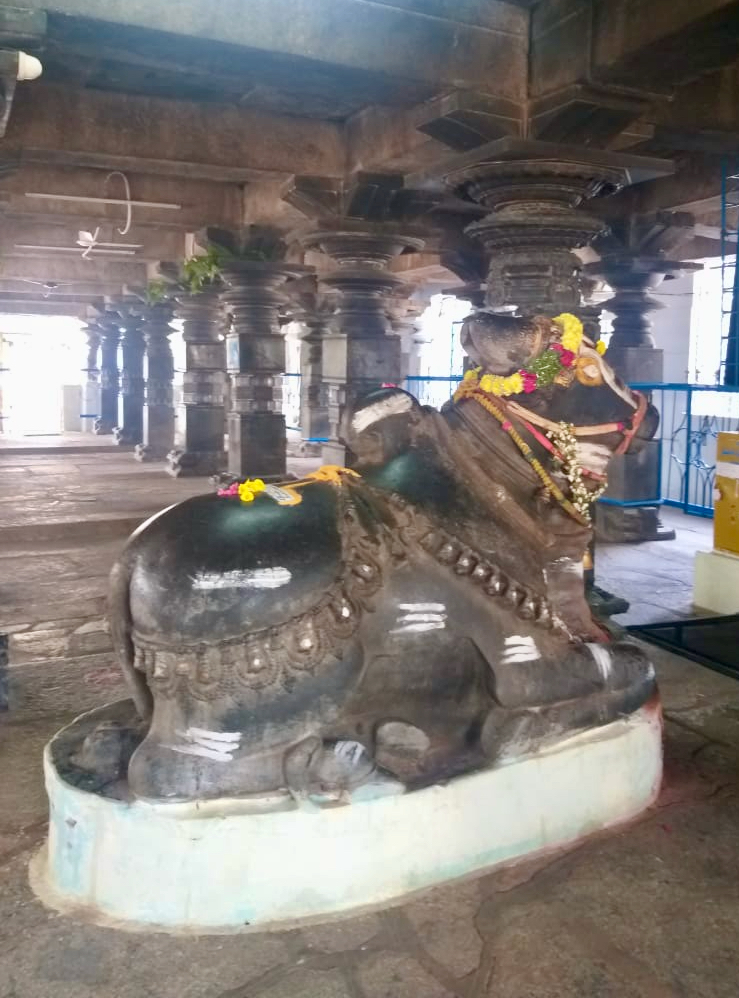
Nandi

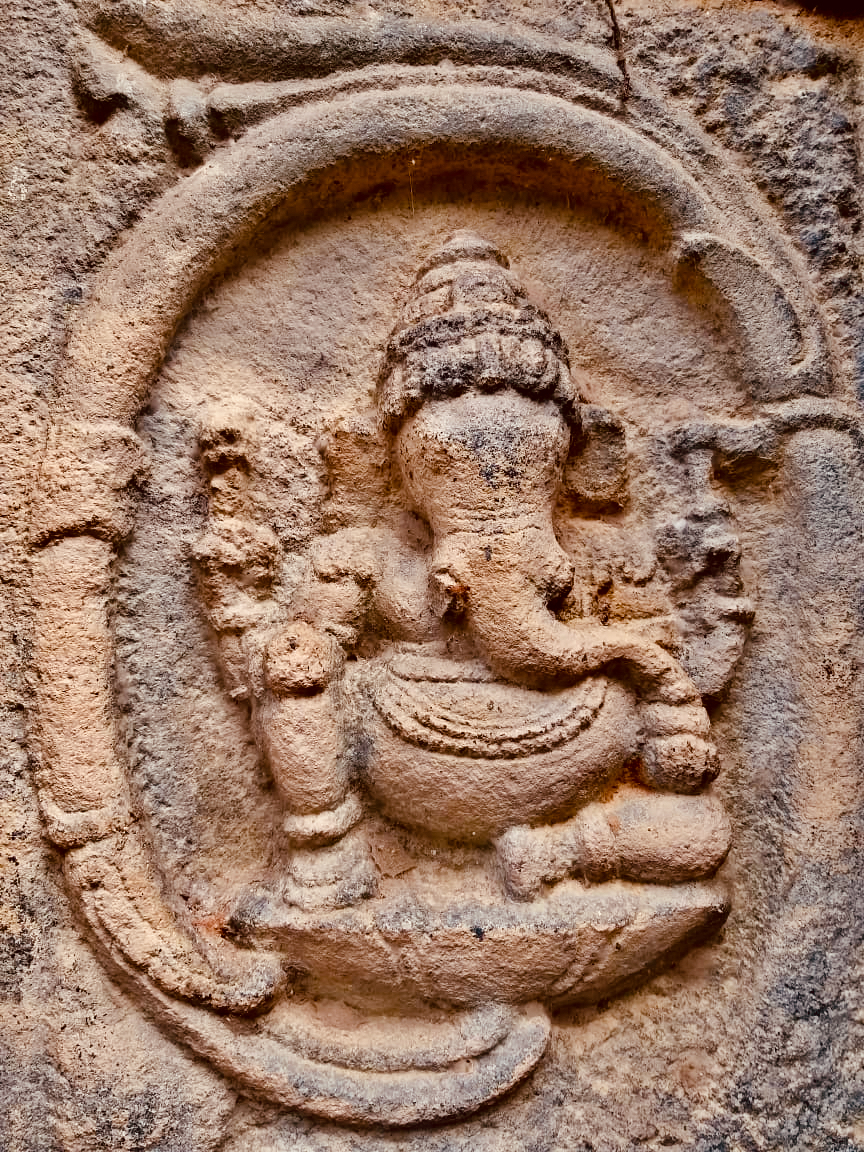
Ganesha

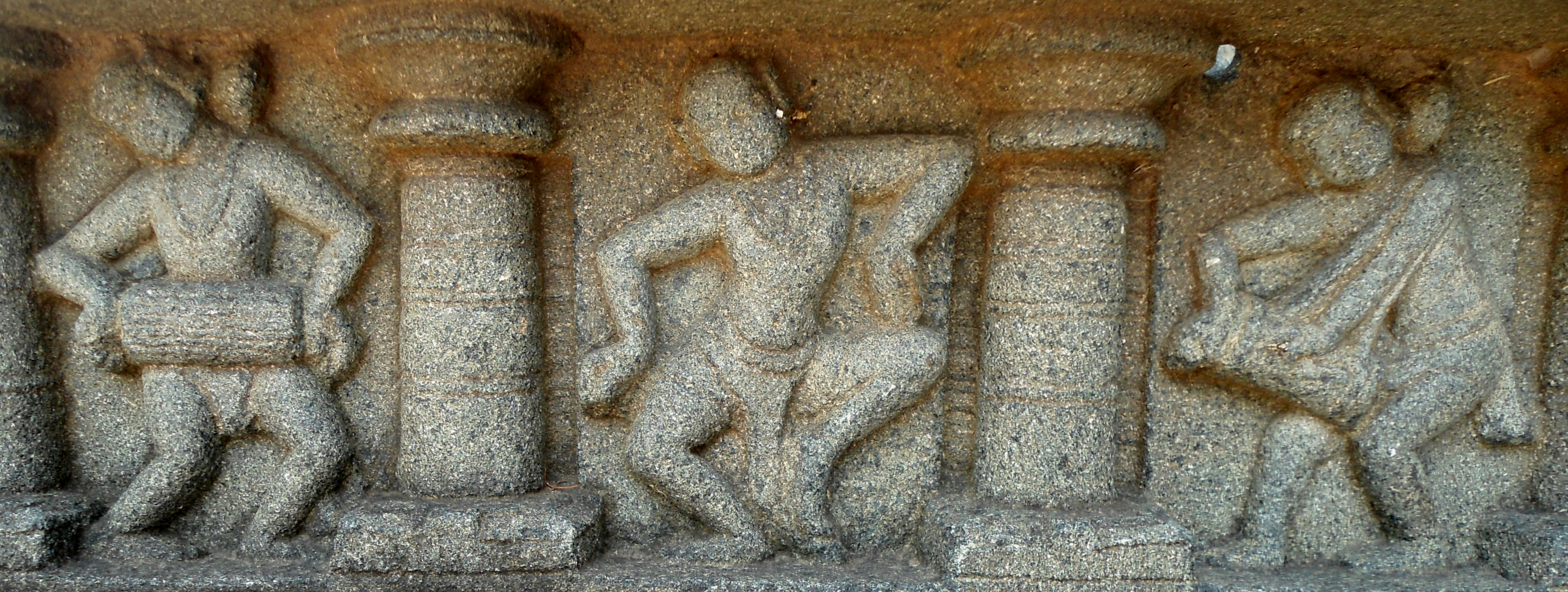
A relief on the temple walls depicting dancers and musicians

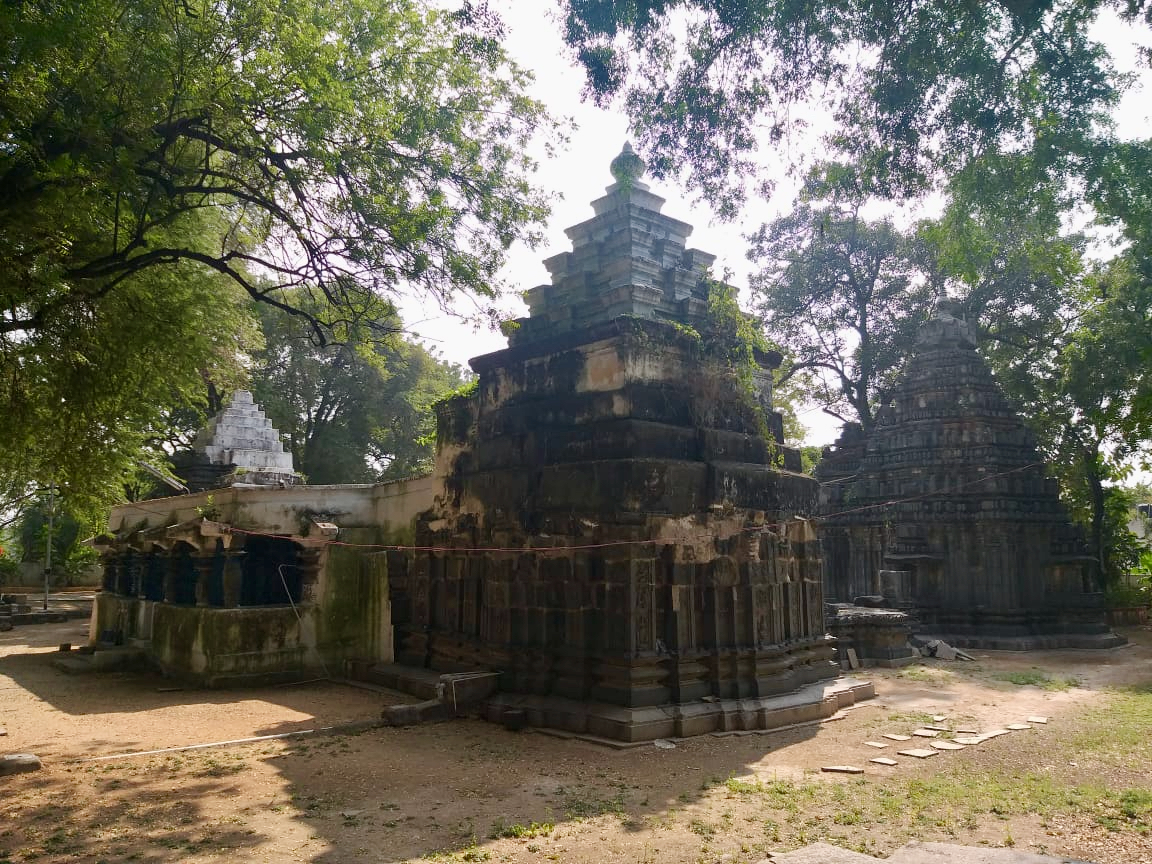
Three of four shrines
