= Panagal, Nalgonda district =

Panagal Panagallu, Panugal
- Town
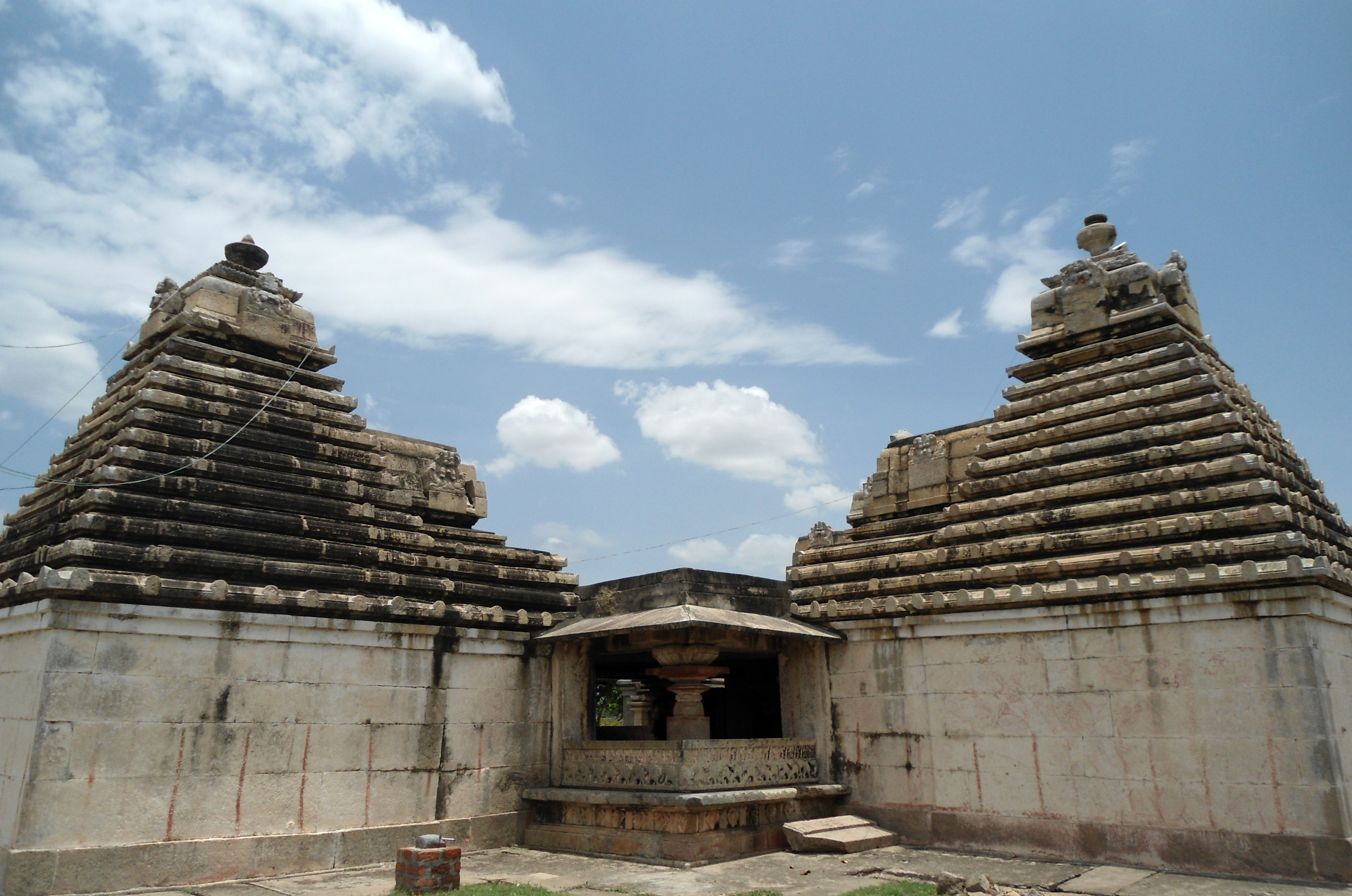
- Sri Chaya Someswara Temple at Panagal

- Location in Telangana, India
- Coordinates: 17.077236°N 79.287336°E
- Country: India
- State: Telangana

Languages
  - Official: Telugu
- Time zone: UTC+5:30 (IST)
- Postal code: 508001
- Vehicle registration: TS 05
- Nearest cities: Nalgonda, Suryapet
- Website: telangana.gov.in

Panagal, also referred to as Panagallu or Panugallu, is a historic town located 4 km northeast from Nalgonda city in Telangana, India.

Panagal is older than Nalgonda, and was a capital of several dynasties between the 9th and 13th-centuries. The Hindu governors and kings of various dynasties, including the Kakatiyas built major public infrastructure in Panagal. This included a water reservoir called the Udaya Samudram in historic texts that has evolved into the Panagal Reservoir with the modern era Srisailam project. The early dynasties also built several major temples in Panagal such as the Chaya Someswara temple and Pachala Someswara temple. These were mostly ruined during the Deccan wars between Islamic Sultanates and Hindu kingdoms. Four temples survive, while coins, inscriptions, temple parts, fort ruins and statues from other lost historic monuments found in this region are now preserved in the Panagal Museum established in 1982.

By the 19th-century, Panagal had been reduced to a small village. With the growth of Nalgonda city, Panagal has been incorporated and now a part of the Nalgonda municipal area. In state literature, it is sometimes subdivided into Panagallu (Urban) and Panagallu (Rural).

== History ==
Panagal is a historic site. The earliest records mention it as one of the regional capitals of the Kadumba dynasty, from where governors and kings of Andhradesa ruled this part of Dakkhina-kshetra (Deccan-region). With Kirtivarman's conquest, the Chalukyas gained and nurtured Panagal, building some temples in the Chalukyan style. It was one of three capitals for Chalukyas, the other two being Vardhamanapuram and Kandur. Later the Cholas (Chodas), Yadavas-Seunas, and Kakatiyas ruled their regions in Telingana from their administrative headquarters at Panagal. In 1124 CE, Udayaraju of the Chola dynasty constructed a large water tank to the northeast of the town. Panagal reached its highest state of development with the Kakatiya dynasty. They expanded the tank, built many public wells for drinking water, and built several major temple complexes, now considered among the finest examples of Kakatiya architecture of Hindu temples. The reach of historic Panagal is evident from the numerous old public wells found over a 5-kilometers range from the bund of the historic water reservoir, and the remains of a mud fort that is found in a circular radius of about 3 kilometers. Panagal was mostly destroyed in the centuries after the 13th-century, and reduced to a small village by the 19th-century. By the advent of the modern age, the majestic temples were in ruins and replaced with small village temples and a few mosques.

The history of Panagal is evidenced by numerous inscriptions found on stones, panels and fragments of panels found near the temple, in the farm fields and on some broken panels found with Muslim tombs. They generally refer to this place as Panugallu, mention kings or governors in Deccan history. A few of these are dated to, for example, the Kalyani Chalukya era. Others mention men or women of different classes and other major Hindu dynasties. These record gifts to maintain the temple, for the priest, for vocal musicians, for instrumental music performances, for garlands, for dancing, for festivals, and in one case "half to the god and half to the people" in Panagallu. Some of these inscriptions are still in Panagal, while others have been moved to the local museum and to the state museum.

=== Temples ===
Panagal has several historic temples, all from the 11th to 12th century:

- Chaya Someswara temple in the northeast part of Panagal, a complex of 7 temples of which one is the main trikuta temple
- Pachala Someswara temple in the north side of Panagal, this is the most sophisticated, intricately carved temple in Panagal notable for hosting simultaneous sanctums of same size for Shaiva, Vaishnava, Shakta and Saurya traditions of Hinduism
- Venkatesvara temple

Statues and sculptures of Hindu gods and goddesses dating back to Andhra Ikshvakus of 3rd century CE are preserved and protected at the museum constructed in the compound of Pachala Someswara Swamy temple. Some of the ancient Siva lingas preserved in the museum were collected from a village called Yelleswaram (a Saivite centre), which was submerged during the construction of Nagarjuna Sagar dam.

During late 14th Century and early 15th century, there was an equilibrium of sorts between Recherla Padmanayaks in Central Telangana, Panta Reddis in Coastal Andhra, Bahmani Sultans of Gulbarga in Western Telangana and Eastern Gangas of Kalinga in the North East (modern Srikakulam and Vijayanagaram). In the south were Vijayanagara kings, in Udayagiri fort (operating from Udayagiri, with base in Vijayanagara).

Recherla Padmanayaks, operating from Rachakonda (Samsathan Narayanpur, near Choutuppal) and Devarakonda, were regional adversaries of Panta Reddis.

The Panta Reddis had established their bases in two places - Kondaveedu and Rajahmundry, the ones from the latter being the juniors. A fratricidal war broke out between Kondaveedu Reddis and Reddis of Rajahmundry. The Kondaveedu Reddis who were in allegiance with Vijayanagara Kings for fending off Recherla Padmanayaks, switched their allegiance to Bahmanis as Vijayanagara kings started reaching out to Rajahmundry Reddis. This in turn angered Recherla kings who till then were in allegiance with Bahmanis to fend off Viyanagara push into the Recherla territories, shifted their allegiance to Vijayanagara kingdom out of pure realpolitik.

A major battle was fought in 1419 at Panagal that led to the victory of Vijayanagara-Rajahmundry Reddi-Recherla Padmanayaks. After this battle, the Kondaveedu Reddi dynasty gradually got extinct.
