= Panagal Museum =

- Established: February 1982
- Location: Panagal, Nalgonda district, Telangana, India
- Coordinates: 17°4′49″N 79°15′11.8″E
- Type: Archaeological

Panagal Archaeological Museum is an archaeological museum located in Panagal village in Nalgonda district, Telangana, India. It is located in the premises of Pachala Someswara temple. It is also close to the Chaya Someswara temple at a distance of 1.3 km to the west of the temple.

The museum was established in February 1982. The total area of the museum complex is nearly 3 acres. It has a collection of around 640 art objects and antiquities - sculptures, prehistoric tools, coins, bronzes, beads, arms and weapons, and copper plate inscriptions. Some objects are displayed in its open-air gallery while most items are located inside its building.

The objects displayed in the museum were collected from excavations carried out in Vardamana Kota, Yeleswaram, Phanigiri, Panagal and many of them have also been acquired from the State Museum, Hyderabad, ranging from 2nd century CE to 18th century CE. The museum also has statues and sculptures of various Hindu gods and goddesses dating back to the Andhra Ikshvaku dynasty of 3rd century CE. Some of the Shivalinga images that are now preserved in the museum were brought from villages that were submerged as a result of construction of Nagarjuna Sagar dam.

== Gallery ==
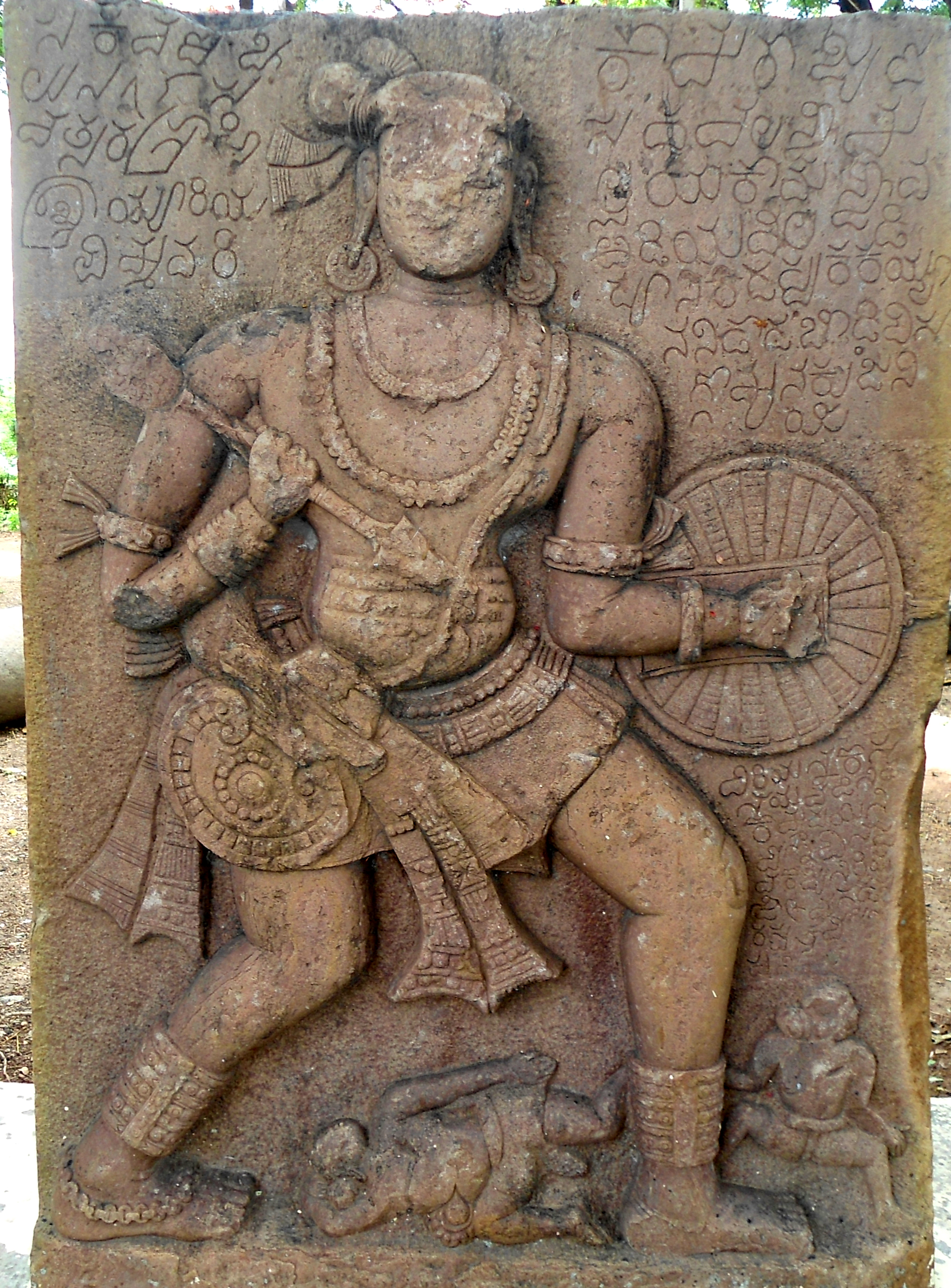
A hero stone (veeragallu) at the museum
