= Chaya Someswara Temple =

Hindu temple in Telangana, India

Chaya Someshwara Temple
- ఛాయా సోమేశ్వరాలయం
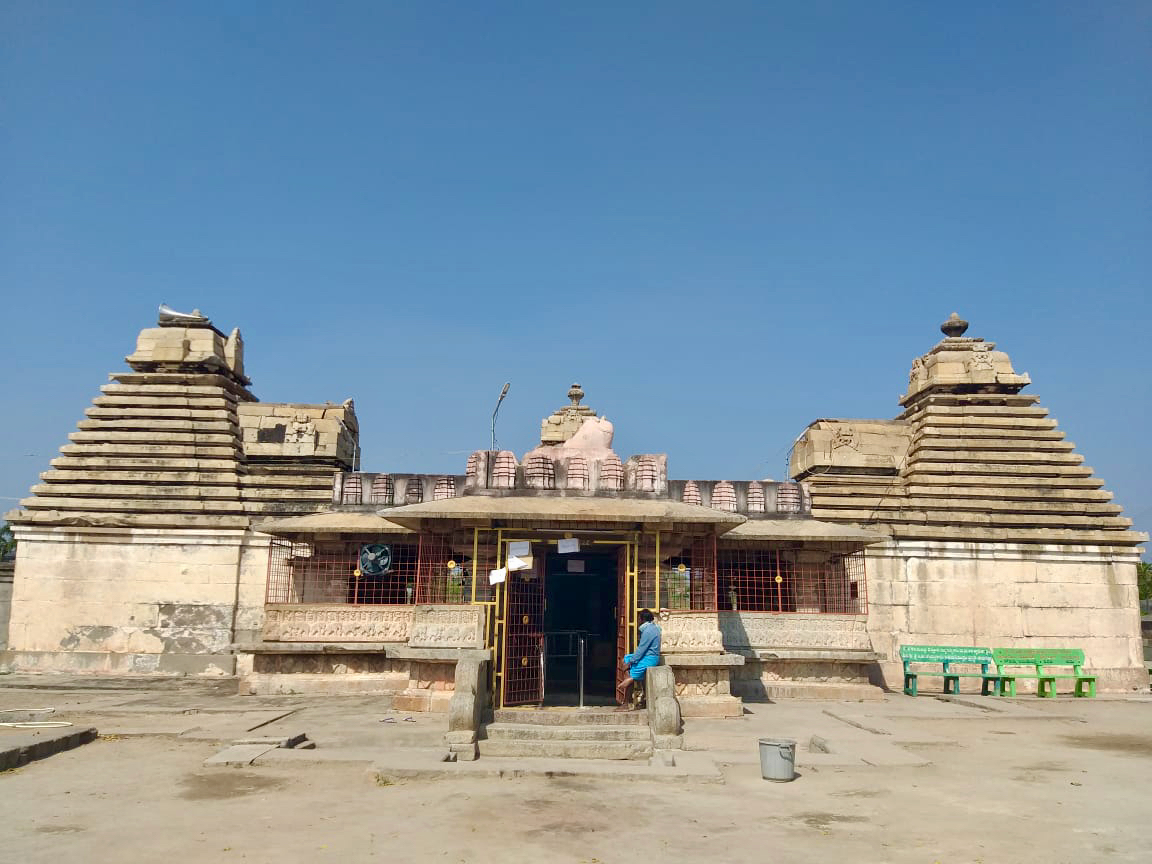
- Chaya Someshwara Swamy Temple at Panagal

- Location in Telangana Chaya Someswara Temple (India)

Religion
- Affiliation: Hinduism
- District: Nalgonda
- Deity: Shiva
- Festival: Shiva ratri

Location
- Location: Panagal
- State: Telangana
- Country: India
- Interactive map of Chaya Someshwara Temple
- Coordinates: 17.07747°N 79.29528°E

Architecture
- Type: Dravidian architecture
- Completed: 11th to 12th century CE
- Inscriptions: There are inscriptions about the temple architecture and construction.

Chaya Someshwara Temple is a Shaivite Hindu temple located in Panagal, Nalgonda district of Telangana, India. It was built around the mid-11th century during the rule of the Kunduru Chodas (a branch of Telugu Cholas), supported and embellished further by later Hindu dynasties of Telangana. Some date it to late 11th to early 12th-century.

The temple, now partially restored, was in ruins in mid 20th-century. It has three garbhagriya (sanctums), a form of temple architecture that is called Trikutalayam (three-shrine complex). The sanctums are dedicated to Shiva, Vishnu and Surya. The three shrines share a common hall (mandapam) with intricately carved pillars in the Telingana style. These carvings depicts scenes from the Mahabharata, Ramayana and Puranas. The temple is a popular pilgrimage site during Maha Shivaratri. The temple has three entrances.

The temple is in close proximity to Pachala Someshwara temple, another Shaivite shrine in Panagal. The pillars in the Ardhamandapa and open spaces near the central Shiva shrine were designed and placed by the temple architect in such a way as to cast a unified shadow (Chaya in Telugu) constantly on the lingam all through the day, irrespective of the position of the sun. This gave its name to the temple - Chaya Someshwara Swamy temple.

== Location ==
The temple is located in Panagal at a distance of nearly 4 km from Nalgonda city, 45 km from Suryapet city and about 107 kilometres from Hyderabad. It is located to the east of the village in the midst of paddy fields near the 11th-century manmade water reservoir called the Udayasamudram. The temple is about 1 kilometer east of the Pachala Someshwara Temple and the Panagal archaeological museum.

== History and date ==
Panagal is a historic site, oft referred to as Panugullu and Panagullu in pre-14th century inscriptions and texts. The earliest records mention it as one of the regional capitals of the Kadumba dynasty, from where governors and kings of Andhradesa ruled this part of Dakshina-kshetra (Deccan-region). The history of Panagal is evidenced by numerous inscriptions found on stones, panels and fragments of panels found near the temple, in the farm fields and on some broken panels found with Muslim tombs. Inscriptions in other parts of India, particularly in the Deccan region, such as the Mamillapalli inscription and the Ramalingala inscription affirm the importance of Panugallu. Some inscriptions call the local rulers by the site's name, as Panugallu-puravaresvara.

With Kirtivarman's conquest, the Chalukyas gained and nurtured Panagal, building some smaller temples in the Chalukyan style. It was one of three capitals for Chalukyas, the other two being Vardhamanapuram and Kandur. Later the Cholas (Chodas), Yadavas-Seunas, and Kakatiyas ruled their regions in Telingana from their administrative headquarters at Panagal. In 1124 CE, Udayaraju of a branch of the Telugu Chola dynasty constructed a large water tank to the northeast of the town. Between about 1150 to 1250 CE, two major temples were built in Panagal, including the Chaya Someshwara temple. There is no foundation inscription available at this temple, and the estimated date of completion vary by scholars. Dhaky and Meister date it to mid 11th-century based on the architectural style and iconography, attributing it to the Kunduru Chodas. Other scholars date it a bit later to early 12th-century.

== Description ==
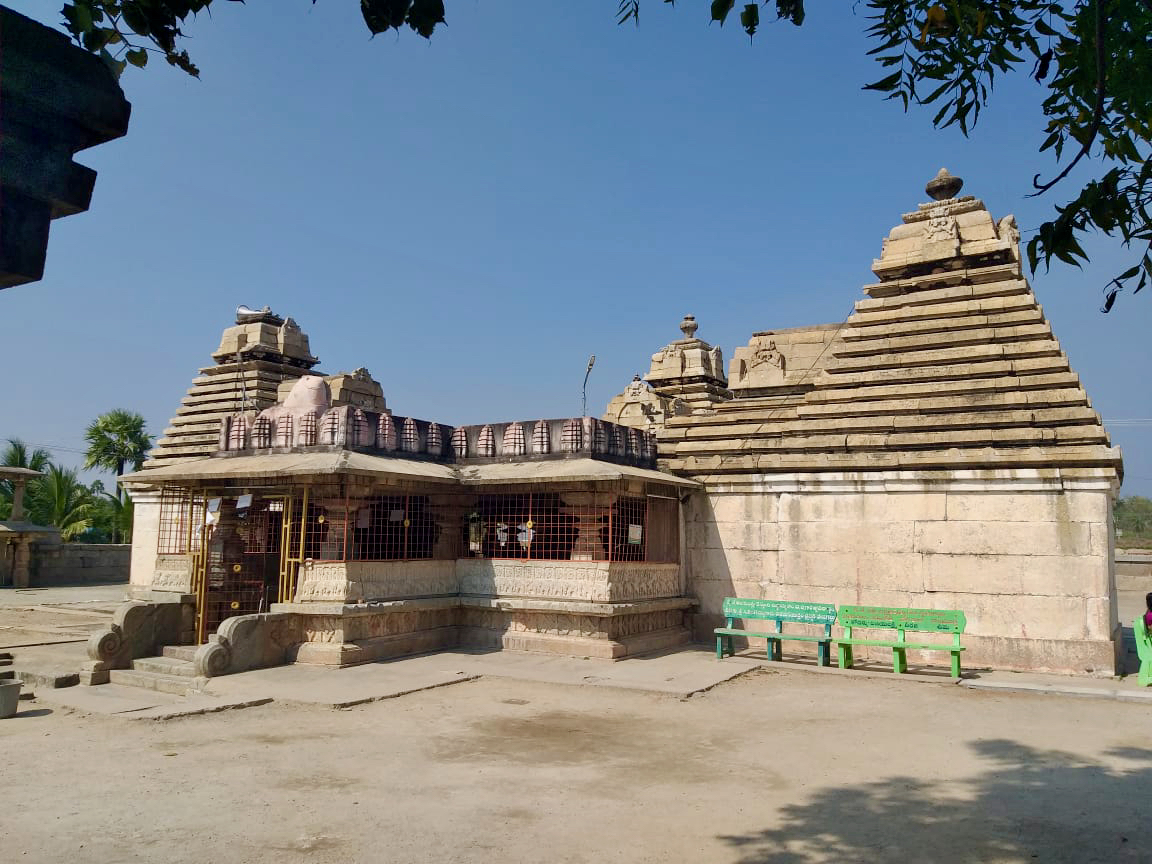
Triple sanctum main temple

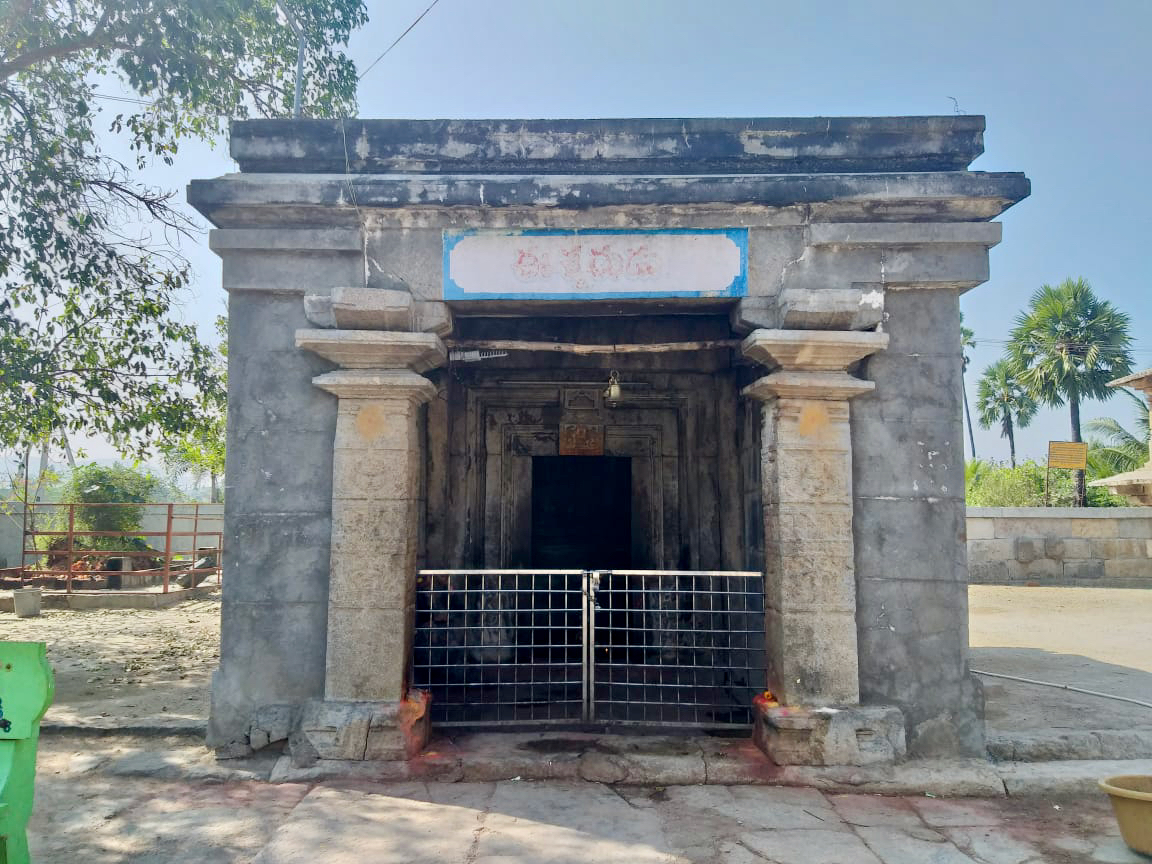
A secondary shrine

Temples within the Chaya Someshwara complex

The Chaya Someshwara temple is actually a complex of shrines within a prakara (compound) wall built from large blocks of stone. The main temple is a trikuta shrine that was in ruins and now partially restored. It faces east. This temple has three entrances, with the one in south being the main larger entrance. Other than the main temple, there are six subsidiary shrines within the prakara walls. Two of these are located to the south of the main temple, three towards the west, and one in the north. These were likely added after the main temple because they lack symmetry in layout and differ in the architectural style from the main temple.

The main trikuta temple shares a mandapa (pilgrim hall). Each side of the three-sanctum temple is an austere cube with plain walls. On each is a phamsana-type vimana superstructure, one of many types of Hindu temple architecture described in Sanskrit texts. Each cube has a nominal adhisthana of the manchabandha class, while on top of the vimana is the Dravida-ghanta, a feature so named in the Aparajitaprccha, an Indian Vastu Sastra text.

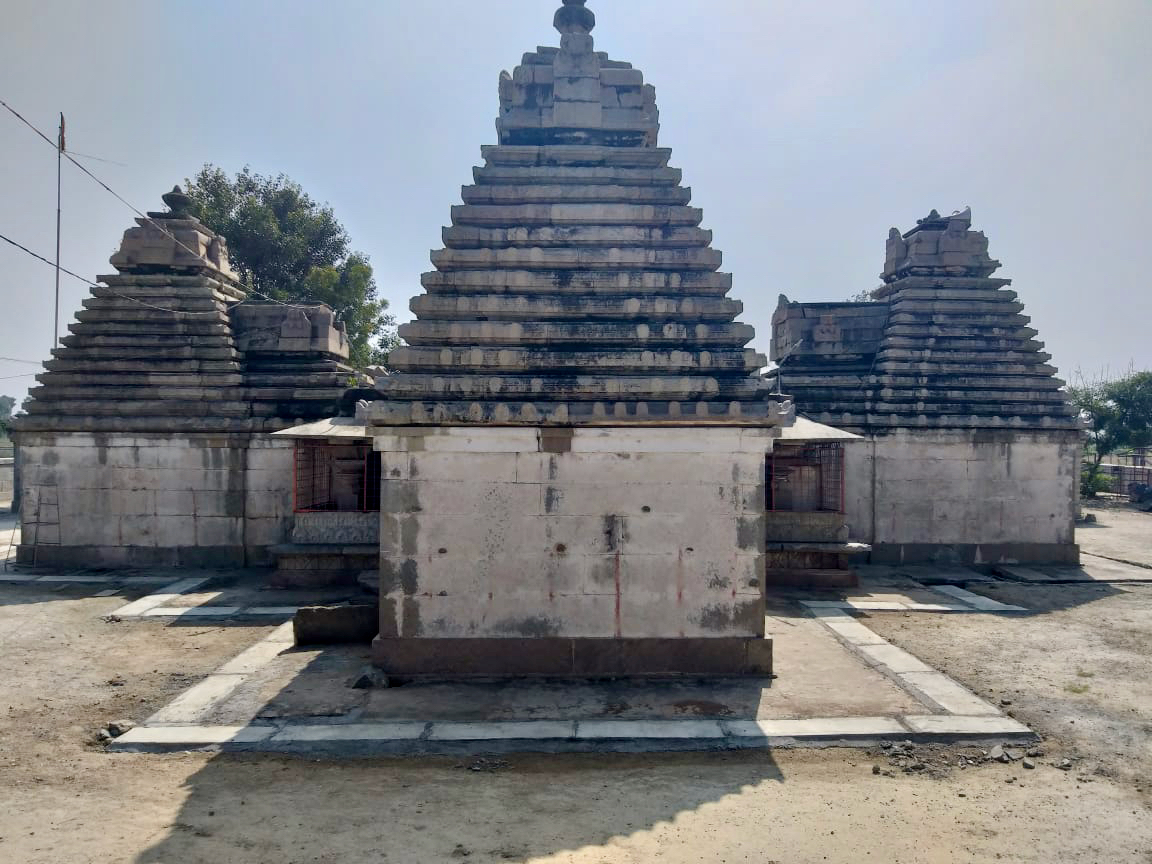
The vimana are square phamsana style.

The mandapa's façade is carved with stylized flowers inset in panels of the kandhara, along with stylized kapotapali, a layer of gajapatti, and frolicking bhutas in the kaksasana in accordance with Hindu texts on temple architecture. The mandapa is provided with a bench that also supports nicely placed Citrakhanda pillars, while four decorated Citrakhanda pillars similar to those found in vividly decorated Pallava-era and Alampur Hindu temples of 9th and 10th-centuries. A notable feature of the Chaya Someshwara temple is its "plain" square phamsana vimana with shared gudhamandapa style, a feature found in Sirikonda Venugopala temple ruins east of Suryapet. These evidence experimentation and innovations by Indian shilpins (artisans and architects) in the evolving Telingana architecture by the 11th century.

Of the three shrines, the one on the east houses Surya, the solar deity and the one facing north has a Vishnu shrine. The third one houses Sri Someshwara (Lord Shiva), the main deity in the form of a lingam. The pillars are decorated with intricate carvings depicting scenes from Ramayana, Mahabharata, and Puranas. The temple got its name as there is an everlasting shadow (Chaya in Telugu) on the Shiva Lingam in the main temple all day long.

The ceiling blocks are carved, with the central section featuring ashta-dikpala and Natesa (dancing Shiva) in the center. However, the carving is smaller and more eroded compared to the one in nearby Pachala Someshwara temple, likely because this feature was getting phased out of Hindu temples of Telingana by around 1100 CE. The antarala of each sanctum has a pair of pillars. The doorframes before each sanctum is simpler than the Pachala temple, yet enlivened by figurines at its pedyapinda section. The Chaya Someshwara temple illustrates the square principle of Hindu architecture, in nearly every section, from its sanctums to mukhamandapa, rangamadapa, antarala, and in the vimana superstructure. Even the pillars, panels, niches and interior ceiling frames follow the square principle.

== Gallery ==
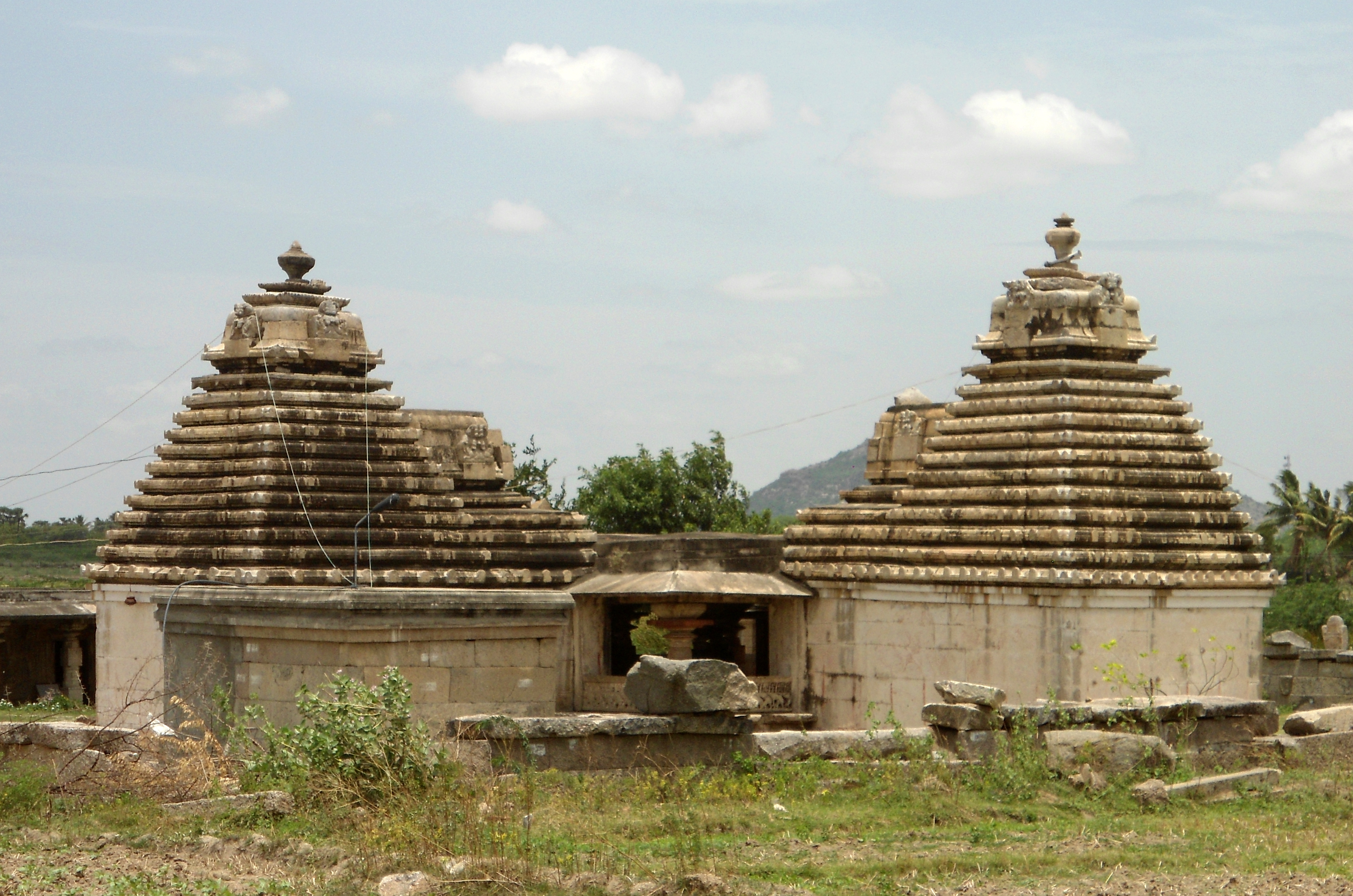
Chaya Someshwara Temple

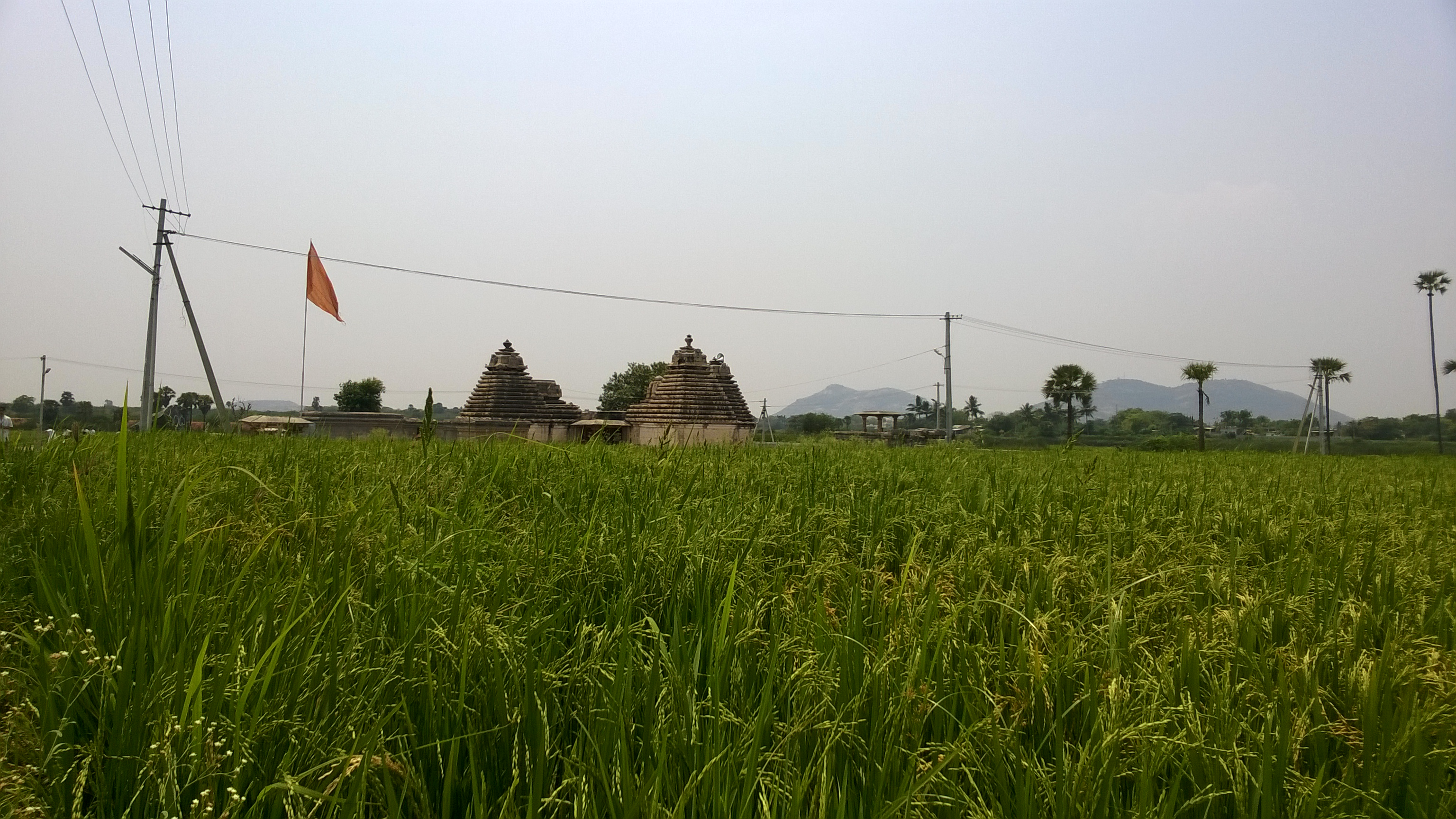
Chaya Someshwara Temple (wide angle)

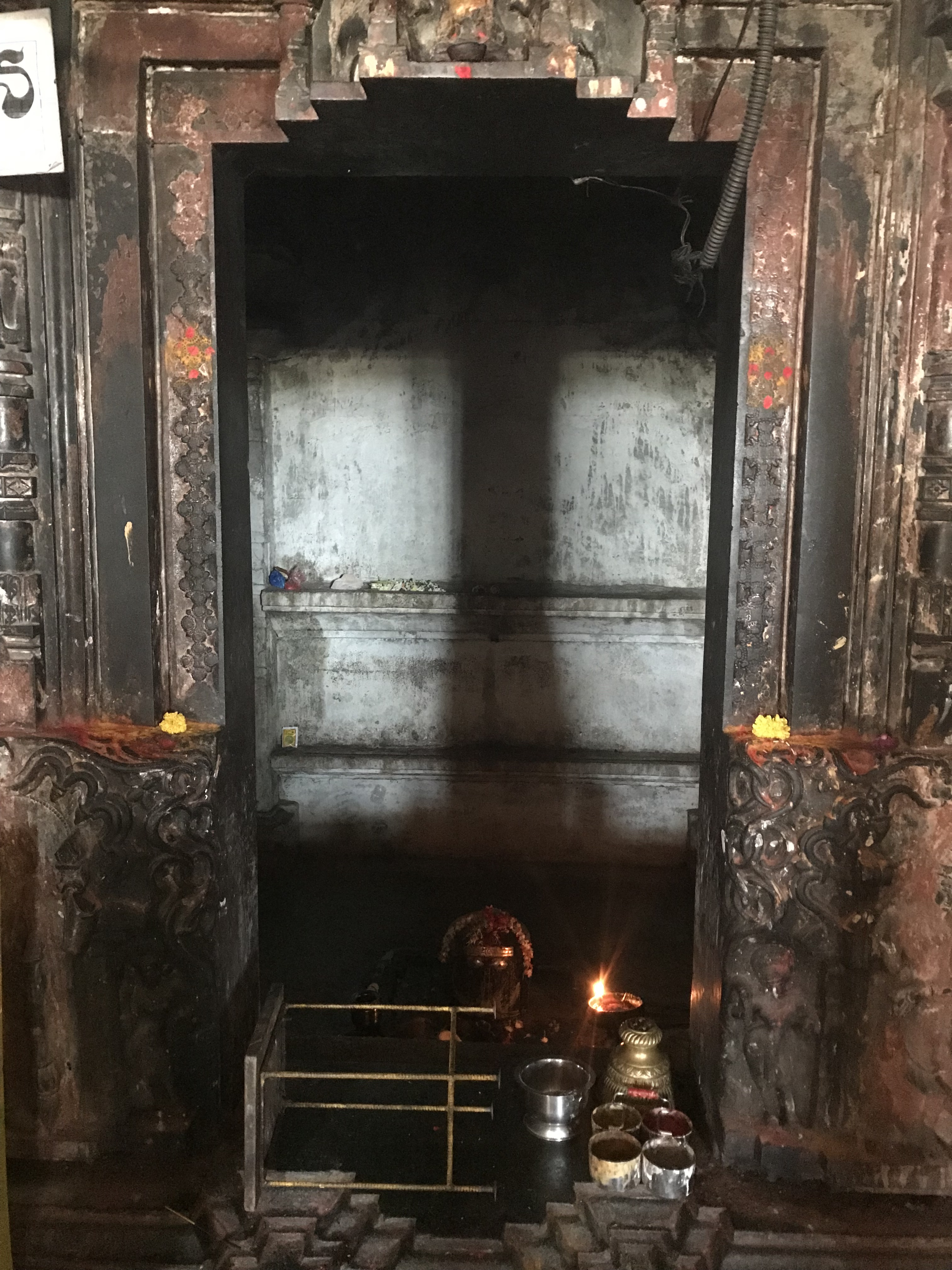
Unified shadow cast on the Shiva lingam

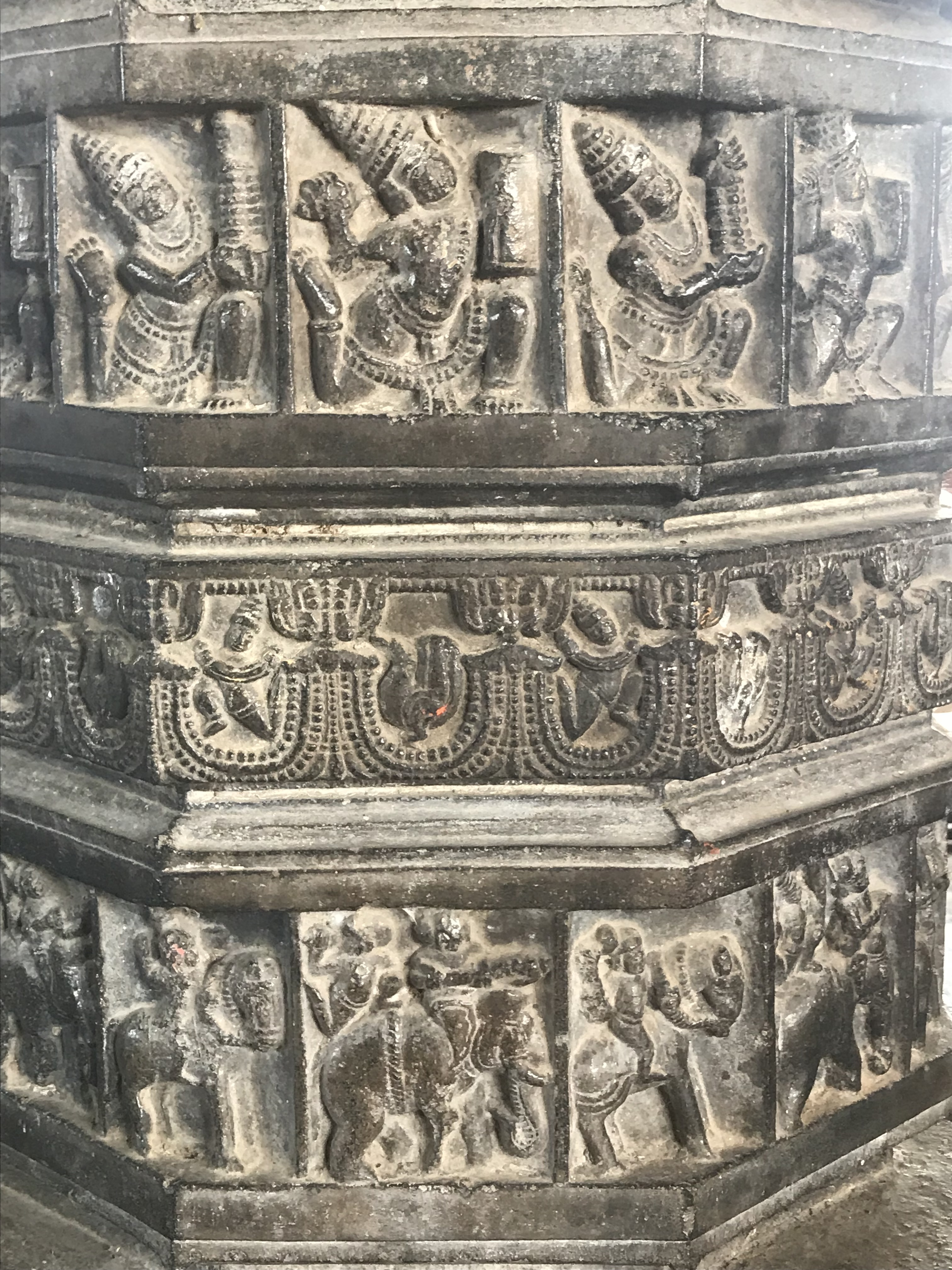
Carvings on the temple pillar
