= Chennakeshava Temple, Belur =

12th-century Vishnu temple complex in Belur, Karnataka (Hoysala Empire era)

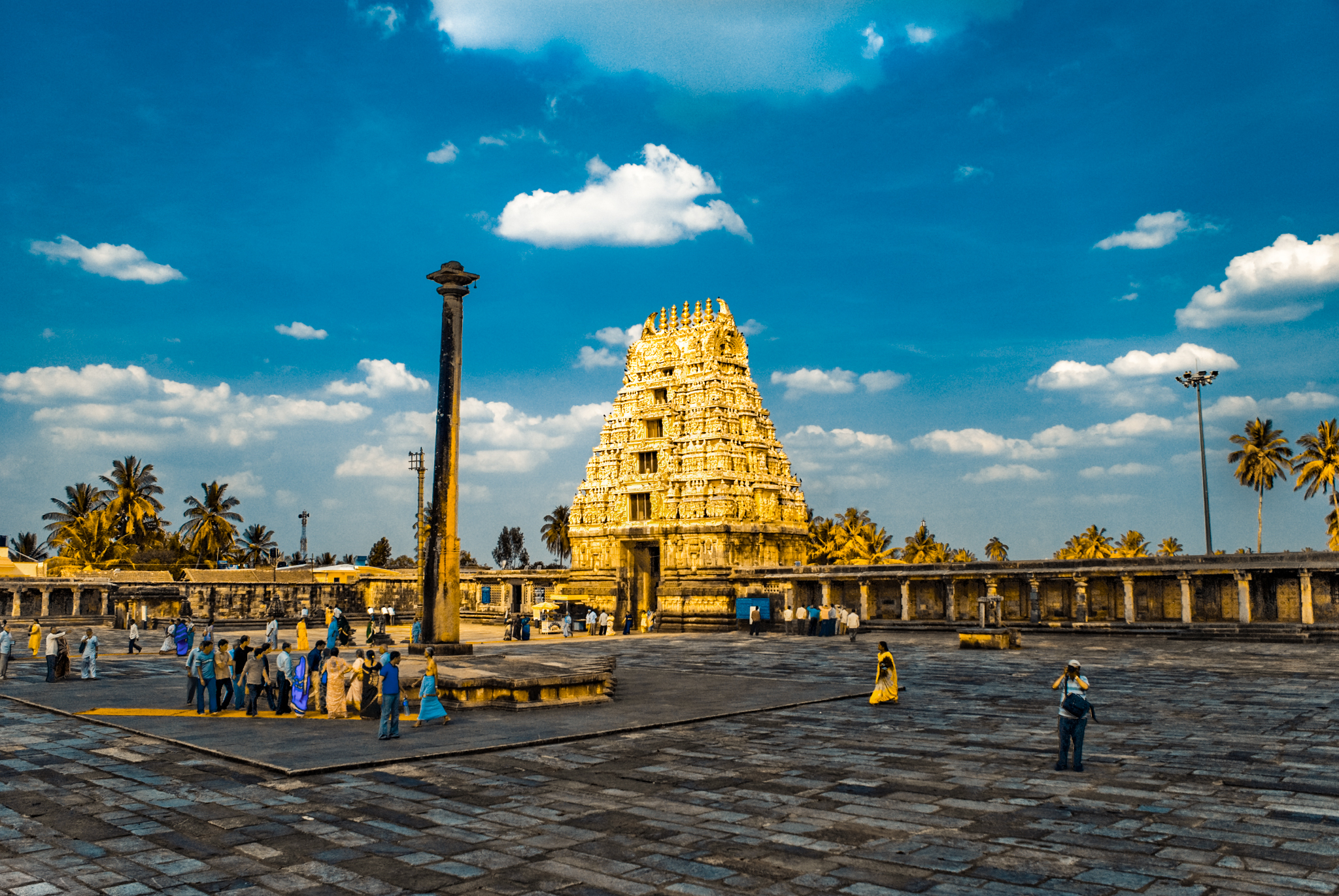
- The entrance Gopura and courtyard of Chennakeshava temple at Belur

- Location in Karnataka Chennakeshava Temple, Belur (Karnataka)

Religion
- Affiliation: Hinduism
- District: Hassan
- Deity: Chennakeshava (Vishnu)
- Year consecrated: 10 March 1117

Location
- Location: Karnataka, India
- State: Karnataka
- Country: India
- Coordinates: 13.162930°N 75.860593°E

Architecture
- Type: Hoysala
- Creator: Hoysala Vishnuvardhana
- Completed: 12th-century

Website
- Sri Chennakeshava Temple

UNESCO World Heritage Site
- Official name: Sacred Ensembles of the Hoysalas
- Type: Cultural
- Criteria: i, ii, iv
- Designated: 2023 (45th session)
- Reference no.: 1670

The Chennakeshava Temple, also referred to as the Keshava, Kesava or Vijayanarayana Temple, is a 12th-century Hindu temple in the Hassan district of Karnataka, India. It was commissioned by King Vishnuvardhana in 1117 CE, on the banks of the Yagachi River in Belur, an early Hoysala Empire capital. The temple was built over three generations and took 103 years to finish. It was repeatedly damaged and plundered during wars, repeatedly rebuilt and repaired over its history. It is located 35 km from Hassan city and about 220 km from Bengaluru.

Chennakesava (lit, "handsome Kesava") is a form of the Hindu god Vishnu. The temple is dedicated to Vishnu and has been an active Hindu temple since its inception. It is reverentially described in medieval Hindu texts, and remains an important pilgrimage site in Vaishnavism. The temple is remarkable for its architecture, sculptures, reliefs, friezes as well its iconography, inscriptions and history. The temple artwork depicts scenes of life in the 12th century, dancers and musicians, as well as a pictorial narration of Hindu texts such as the Ramayana, the Mahabharata and the Puranas through numerous friezes. It is a Vaishnava temple that reverentially includes many themes from Shaivism and Shaktism, as well as images of a Jina from Jainism and the Buddha from Buddhism. The Chennakeshava temple is a testimony to the artistic, cultural, and theological perspectives in 12th-century South India and the Hoysala Empire rule.

The Belur temple complex, along with the nearby Hoysaleswara Temple at Halebidu and the Keshava Temple at Somanathapura, was declared a World Heritage Site by UNESCO in 2023 as part of the Sacred Ensembles of the Hoysalas.

== Location ==
The Chennakeshava Temple is located in Belur taluk in Hassan district of the Indian state of Karnataka. It is about 35 kilometres (22 mi) northwest of Hassan. The temple is about 16 kilometres (9.9 mi) from Halebidu temple. Belur has no nearby airport, and is about 220 kilometres (137 mi) west of Bengaluru (IATA Code: BLR), about 3.5 hours drive accessible with a four lane NH75 highway. Hassan is the closest city near Belur that is connected by railway network to major cities of Karnataka.

The Chennakeshava Temple is an active Hindu temple and a major Vaishnava pilgrimage site. It is located on the banks of Yagachi River (also called Badari River in historic texts), a tributary of Hemavati River.

== History ==
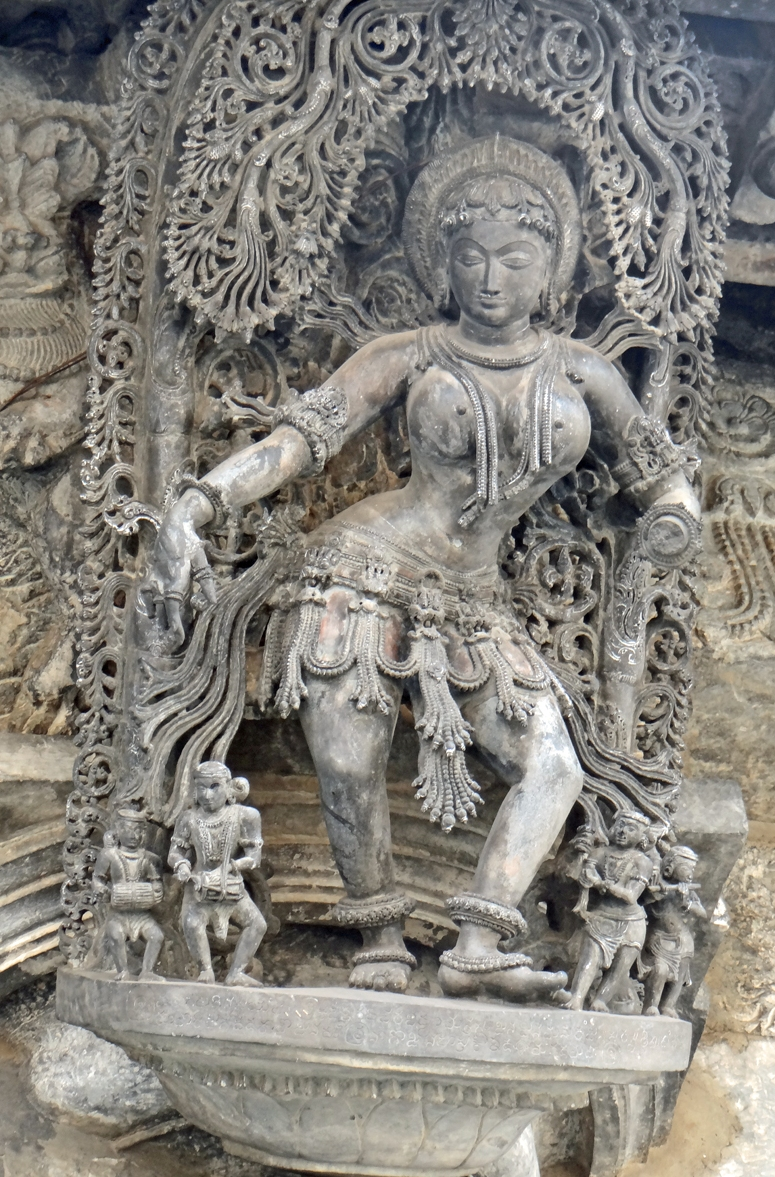
Artwork at Chennakeshava temple.

The Hoysala period of South Indian history began about 1000 CE and continued through 1346 CE. In this period, they built around 1,500 temples in 958 centres. Belur is called Beluhur, Velur or Velapura in old inscriptions and medieval era texts. It was the early capital of the Hoysala kings. The city was so esteemed by the Hoysalas that it is referred to as "earthly Vaikuntha" (Vishnu's abode).

One of the Hoyasala kings was Vishnuvardhana, who came to power in 1110 CE. He commissioned the Chennakeshava temple dedicated to Vishnu in 1117 CE, a temple considered as one of "five foundations" of his legacy. According to Dhaky – a scholar of Indian temple architecture and temple history, this temple reflects the rising opulence, political power, deep spiritual dedication to Sri Vaishnavism of Ramanujacharya, and it is his magnum opus. The main temple is called Vijaya-Narayana and the smaller temple next to it built by his queen Santala Devi is called Chennakesava in the inscriptions of his era, but these two temples are now called the Chennakesava temple and Chennigaraya temple respectively.

The main Chennakeshava temple at Belur was complete and consecrated in 1117 CE, though the complex continued to expand over 100 some years. Vishnuvardhana moved his capital to Dorasamudra, (also referred to as Dvarasamudra, now Halebidu), famous for the Hoysaleswara Temple dedicated to Shiva. Its construction continued till he died in 1140 CE. His legacy was continued by his descendants who completed the Hoysaleswara Temple in 1150 CE, and other temples about 200 kilometers away such as the Chennakesava Temple, Somanathapura in 1258 CE. The Hoysalas employed many noted architects and artisans who developed a new architectural tradition, which art historian Adam Hardy calls the Karnata Dravida tradition. The Chennakeshava Temple has maintained continuity as a functioning place of worship since its establishment in 1117 CE. Its religious use, including rituals and festivals, distinguishes it from the Hoysaleswara Temple at Halebidu and the Keshava Temple at Somanthapura, where regular worship has been discontinued.

The Hoysala Empire and its capital was invaded, plundered and destroyed in the early 14th century by Malik Kafur, a commander of the Delhi Sultanate ruler Alauddin Khalji. Belur and Halebidu became the target of plunder and destruction in 1326 CE by another Delhi Sultanate army. The territory was taken over by the Vijayanagara Empire. The Hoysala style, states James C. Harle, came to an end in the mid 14th century, when Hoysala king Veera Ballala III was killed in a war with the Muslim Madurai Sultanate followed by his son.

=== Inscriptions ===
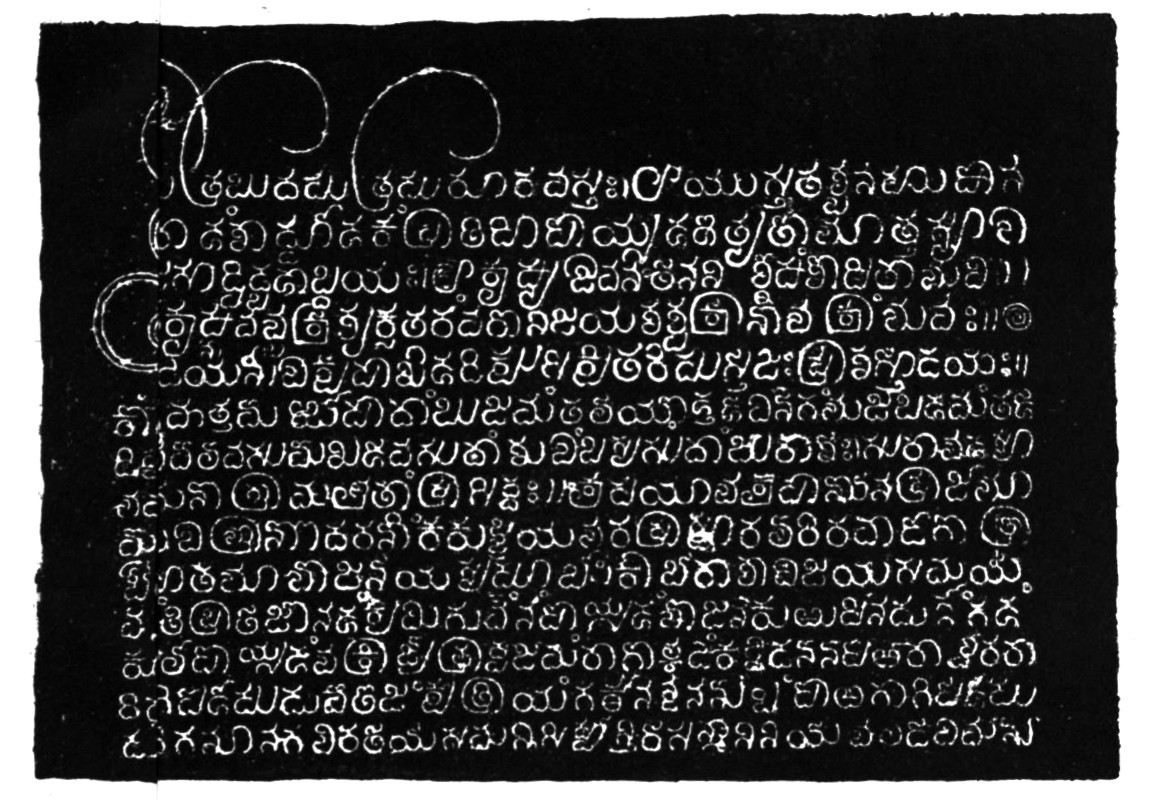
Example Belur temple inscription in Sanskrit, written in Kadamba script.

Historians have found 118 inscriptions in the temple complex, dated between 1117 CE to the 18th century, which provide a history of the temple, the grants made to the Chennakeshava temple for its upkeep and the repairs during later times.

- An inscription found on the east wall near the north entrance of the temple's main mandapa (hall) states that Vishnuvardhana commissioned the temple for god Vijayanarayana in 1117 CE. Some historians have interpreted this inscription as stating that the Chennakeshava Temple was completed in 1117 CE.
- The Chennigaraya temple was built concurrently with the main temple, and the queen sponsored it.
- Narasimha I of Hoysala dynasty made grants to the temple for its maintenance and operation.
- Ballala II in 1175 CE added temple buildings for kitchen and grain storage in the southeast corner, and a water tank in the northeast corner of the temple.
- The original temple was without boundary wall. The main mandapa was also open for the devotees to view and appreciate the intricate carvings inside the temple. For security of the temple, a high wall was constructed around the temple, a wood-and-brick gateway and doors added by Somayya Danayaka during the rule of Veera Ballala III (1292–1343), as well as the open mandapa was covered with perforated stone screens. The new screens darkened the inside of the temple making it difficult to see the artwork but allowed enough light for the darshana of the garbha griya.
- The temple was raided, damaged and its gateway was burnt down in a raid by a Muslim general Salar and his army working for Muhammed bin Tughlaq (1324–1351).
- The temple was repaired by the Vijayanagara Empire under the sponsorship of Harihara II (1377–1404). In 1381, they added four granite pillars; in 1387, a gold plated kalasa was added by Malagarasa to a new tower above the sanctum; it added a new seven storey brick gopuram in 1397 replacing the destroyed gateway.
- An Andal shrine, the Saumyanayaki shrine, the dipa-stambha at the entrance, the Rama and Narasimha shrines were added during the Vijayanagara Empire era.
- The main temple had a shikara (superstructure tower) but it is now missing and the temple looks flat. The original tower, suggest the inscriptions, was made of a combination of wood, brick and mortar. It was destroyed and rebuilt several times.
- The Vijayanagara Empire sponsored the addition of smaller shrines dedicated to goddesses and the Naganayakana mandapa within the temple complex. These were constructed by collecting the war ruins of other demolished temples in Belur area and reusing them.
- The temple premises were again damaged after the destruction of Vijayanagara Empire by a coalition of Sultanates. The first repairs were done in 1709, followed by additions in 1717 and 1736. The temple was repaired in 1774 by an officer of Hyder Ali during a period when Hyder Ali was the de facto ruler on behalf of the Wadiyar dynasty.
- In late 19th-century, the collapsing tower above the sanctum was removed to save the lower levels and never replaced. In 1935, parts of the temple was cleaned and restored with financing by the Mysore government and grants by the Wadiyar dynasty. The Chennigaraya shrine was rebuilt, new images of Ramanuja and Garuda added along with many other facility improvements and repairs to the complex. These repairs were inscribed in stone for a historical record, just like earlier inscriptions.

== Description ==
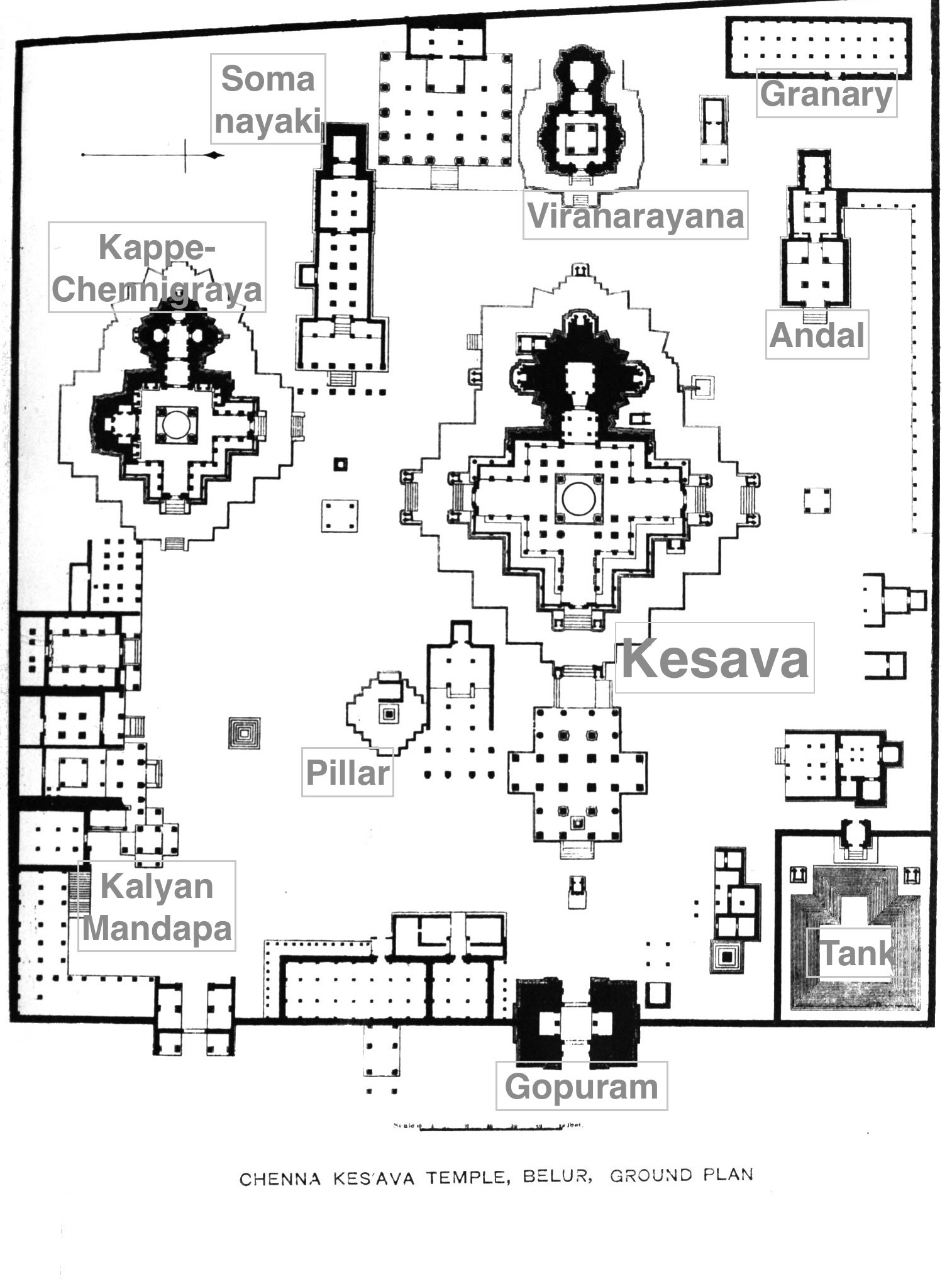
Chennakeshava temples and monuments layout.

The Chennakeshava complex at Belur consists of a 443.5 feet by 396 feet court with several Hindu temples and minor shrines inside a walled compound. (Note: James Harle states that the court dimensions are 380x425 sq ft.) The compound is entered from the east through a Gopuram added during the repairs of the Vijayanagar empire era. The temples and monuments found inside the walled complex are:

- Chennakeshava temple, also called as Kesava temple, is the main temple. It is in the middle of the complex, faces east, in front of the gopuram. Including the improvements added later, it is 178 feet by 156 feet. The temple stands on a wide platform terrace (jagati) about 3 feet high. The temple is dedicated to Vishnu in the form of Kesava.
- To the south of the Kesava temple is the Kappe Chennigaraya temple measuring 124 feet by 105 feet. It has two sanctums inside, one dedicated to Venugopala and the other to Chennigaraya (local popular name of Chennakeshava, Vishnu). The temple is called Kappe Chennigaraya because, according to a local legend, a Kappe (frog) was once found near its navel. This smaller temple was built by the queen concurrently with the main temple, and is believed to be similar smaller version.
- A stone slab with a couple standing side by side in a namaste posture under a canopy. The monument is damaged.

Temples and monuments of Chennakeshava complex
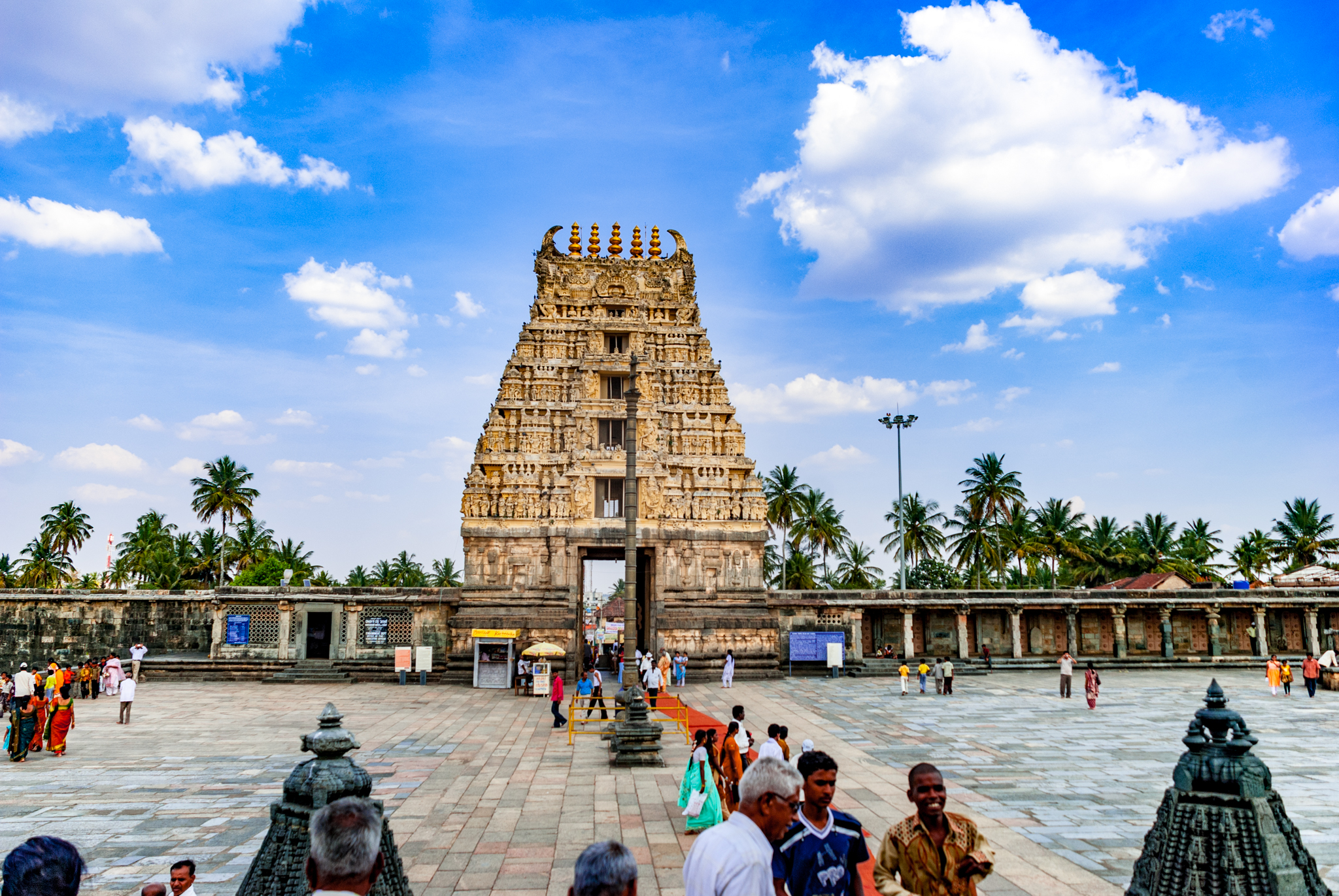
Eastern gopuram

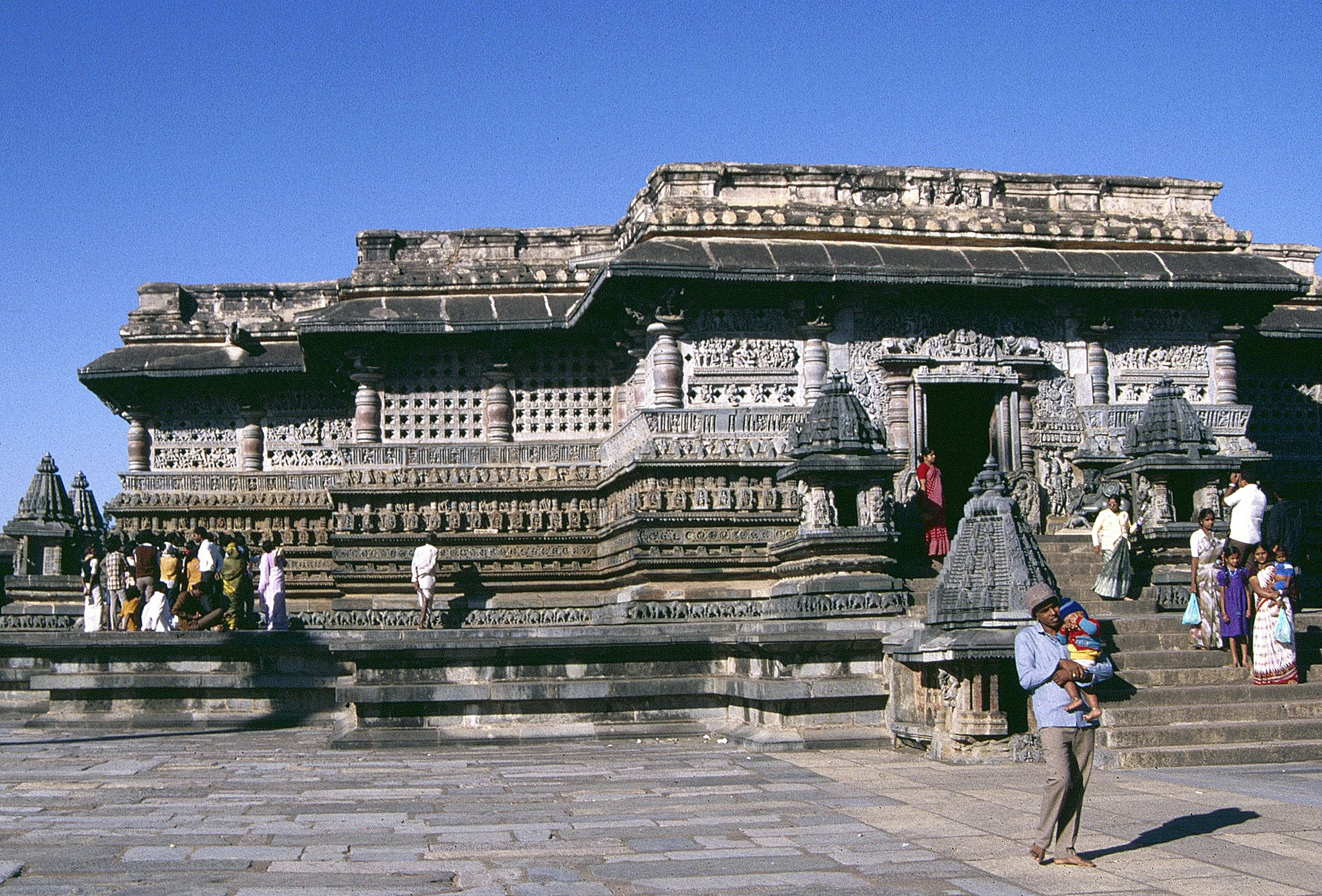
Kesava temple

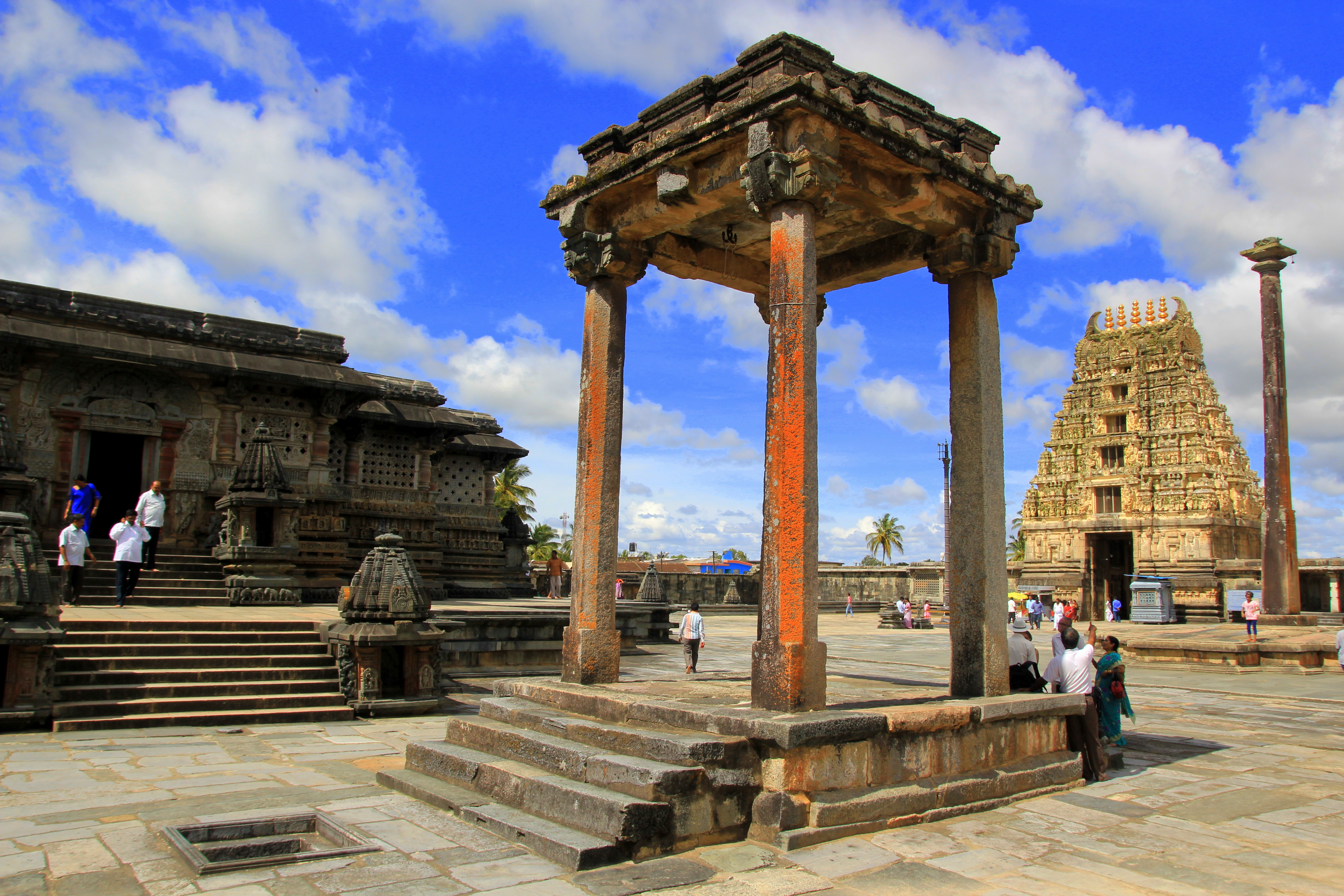
View from center-southwest

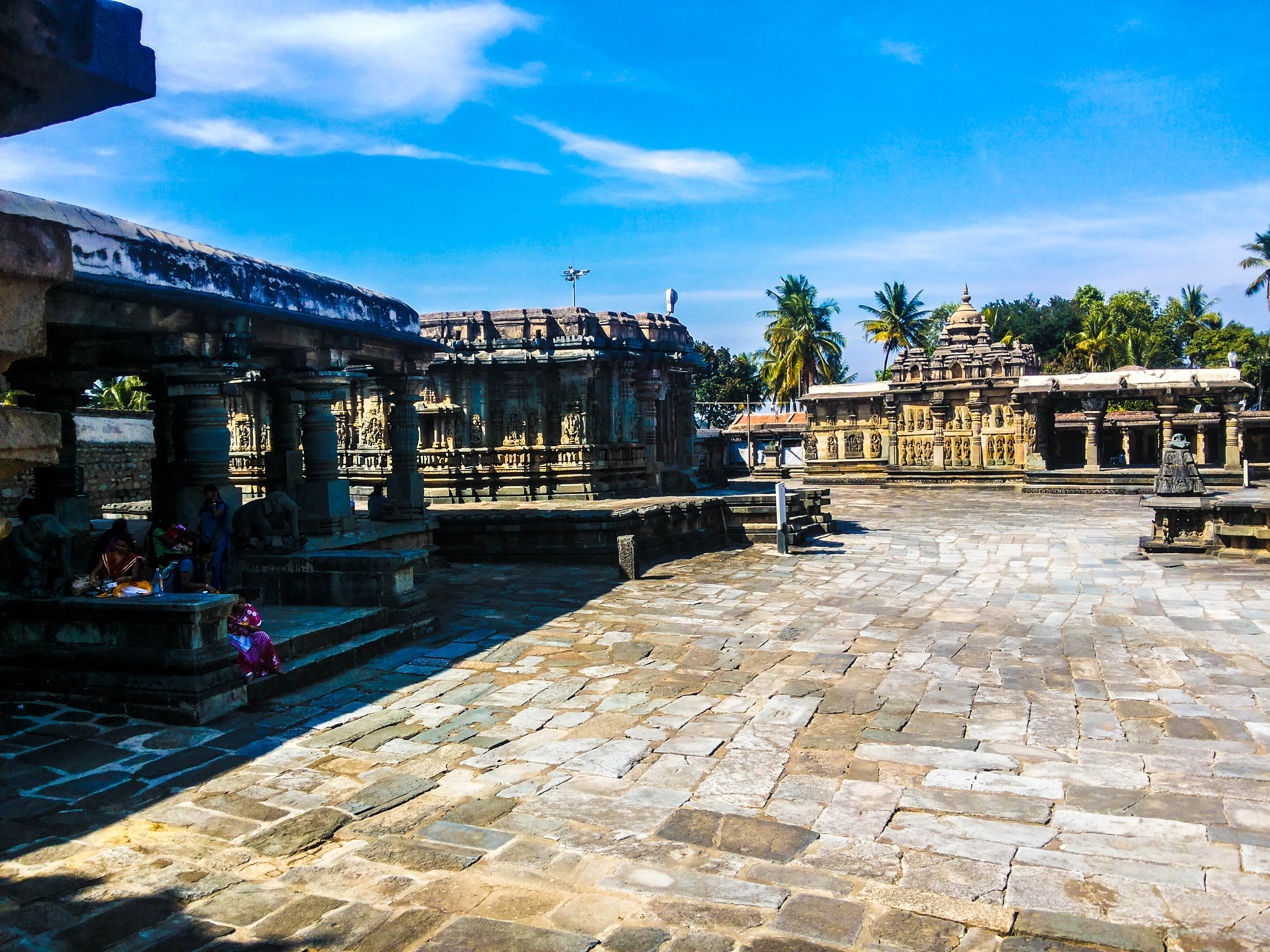
Temples in the west end

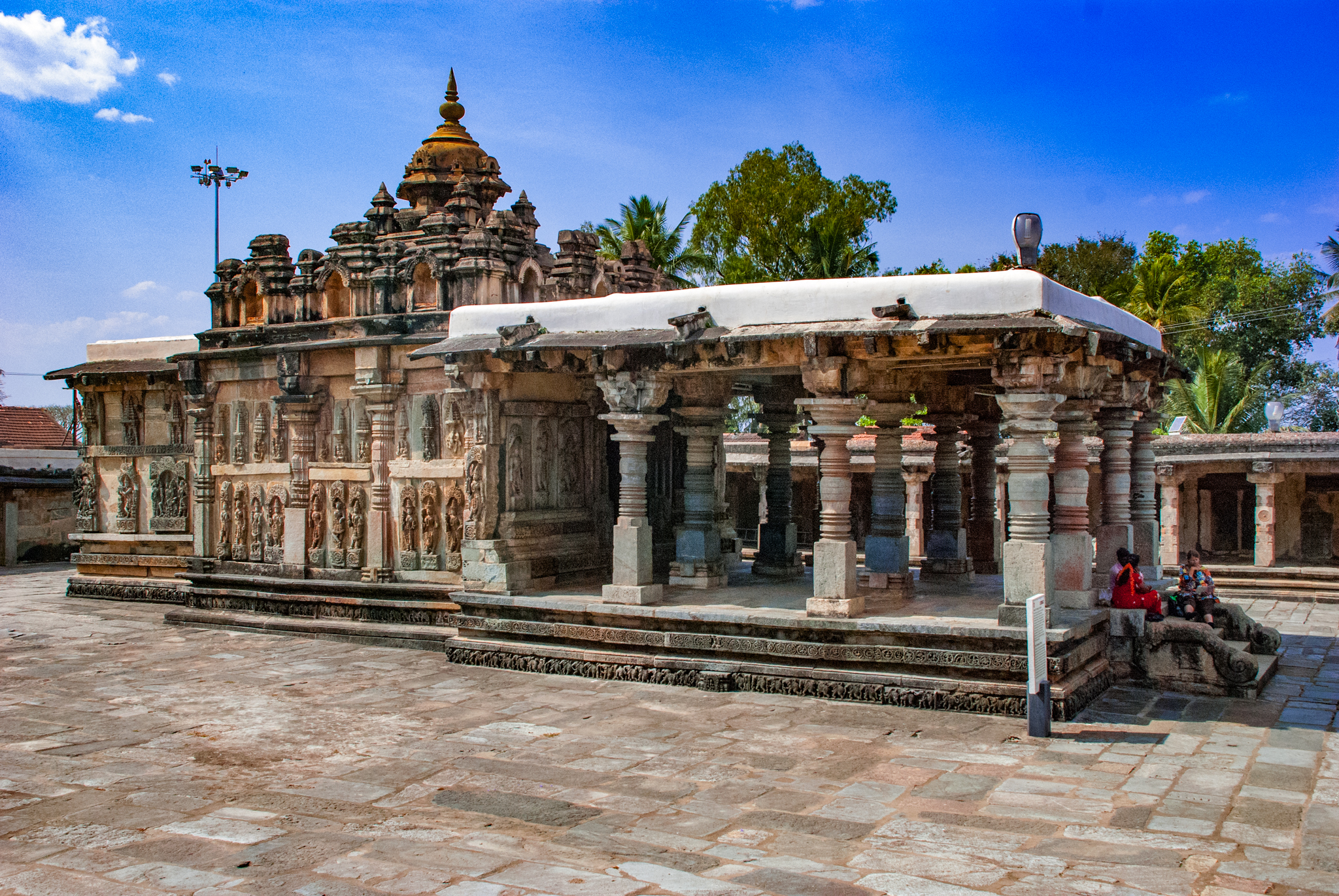
Andal temple

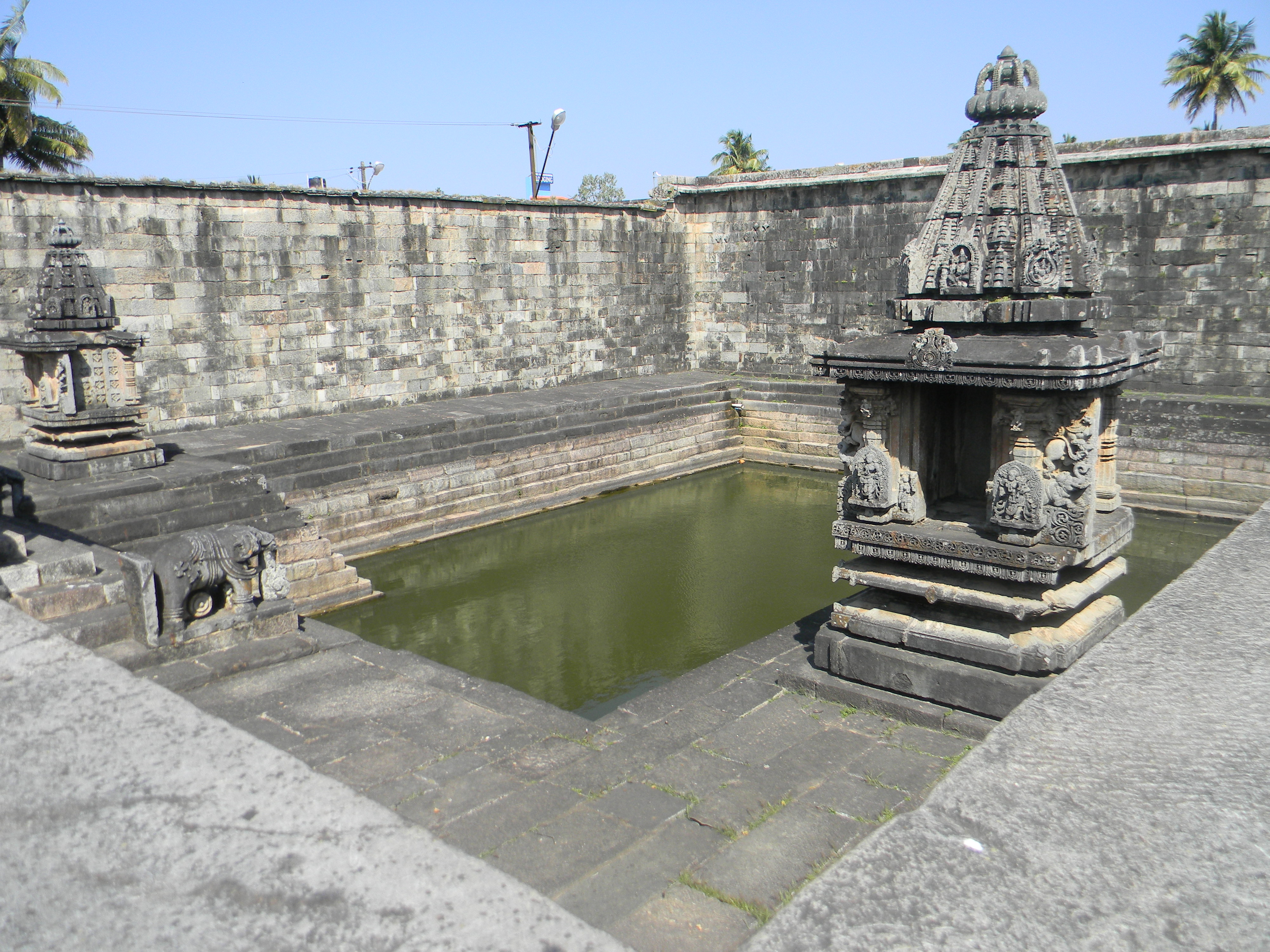
Water tank inside the complex
The Chennakeshava temple includes a number of smaller shrines and monuments.

- To the west of the Kesava temple is the Viranarayana temple measuring 70 feet by 56 feet. It is a small but complete temple with a navaranga (nine square hall) and a garbha griya (sanctum) with 59 large reliefs on the outer walls. These reliefs are dedicated to Vishnu, Shiva, Brahma, Bhairava (angry Shiva), Lakshmi, Parvati, Saraswati and others. Some panels depict the Bhima story from the Mahabharata. The temple is also dated to the 12th century.
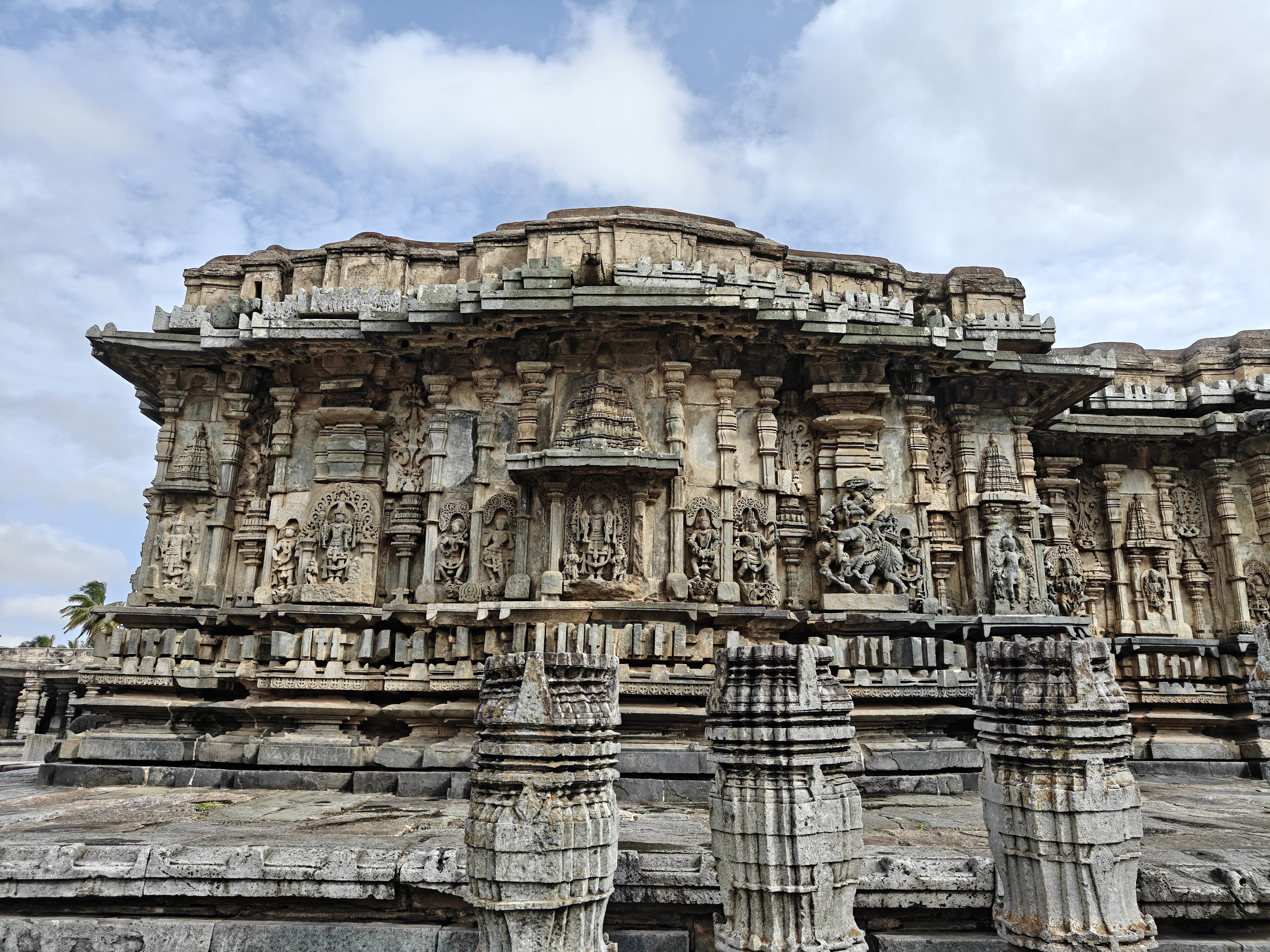
  Viranarayana temple, west of Keshava Temple
- To the southwest of the Kesava temple is a small temple dedicated to Somyanayaki (form of the goddess Lakshmi), also dated to the 12th century. However, the temple was expanded and enhanced later. This temple is notable because the local tradition holds that its tower is miniature version of the major tower that once rose above the main Kesava temple.
- The Andal temple, also called Ranganayaki shrine, is to the northwest of the Kesava temple. Its outer wall are decorated with artwork such as elephants and nature. It also displays 31 large images of deities from the Vaishnavism, Shaivism and Shaktism traditions of Hinduism. It also has intricately carved Venugopala, Mohini and Lakshmi, as well as friezes showing legends in the Puranas.
- The complex has a number of small shrines. To the east of Kappe-Chennigaraya temple are shrines for Narasimha, Rama, Jiyar and Alvars of the Bhakti movement fame. To the east of Andal temple are shrines for Krishna, and Vaishnavism scholars Desikar, Bhashyakara and Ramanuja of Vishishtadvaita Vedanta fame. On the base of the shrines for Alvars are friezes showing stories from the Ramayana. Some of these shrines were added later because few of these scholars such as Desikar lived after the 12th century.
- Two main sthambha (pillars) are found in the temple complex. The pillar facing the main temple, the Garuda (eagle) sthambha was erected in the Vijayanagar period while the pillar on the right, the Deepa sthambha (pillar with lamp) dates from the Hoysala period. Near the Viranarayana temple is a mandapa where annual procession ratha and temple vehicles have traditionally been stored. It is called vahana mandapa. The complex also has a kalyana-mandapa in the southeast corner for ceremonies. It was added in the 17th century.
- A granary for storing food reserves is found in the northwest corner of the complex. There is smaller northern gate to the complex, near which is a pakasale or community kitchen built in the 13th century. A stepped water tank, called kalyani or Vasudeva-sarovara in inscriptions, is found in the northeast corner with two stone elephants on its side.

The complex has many other small monuments and features, such as the ane-bagilu or "elephant's gate" just south of the gopuram and a memorial of past destruction in the form of pillars and statues in the northwestern part of the complex.

=== Main temple: Kesava ===
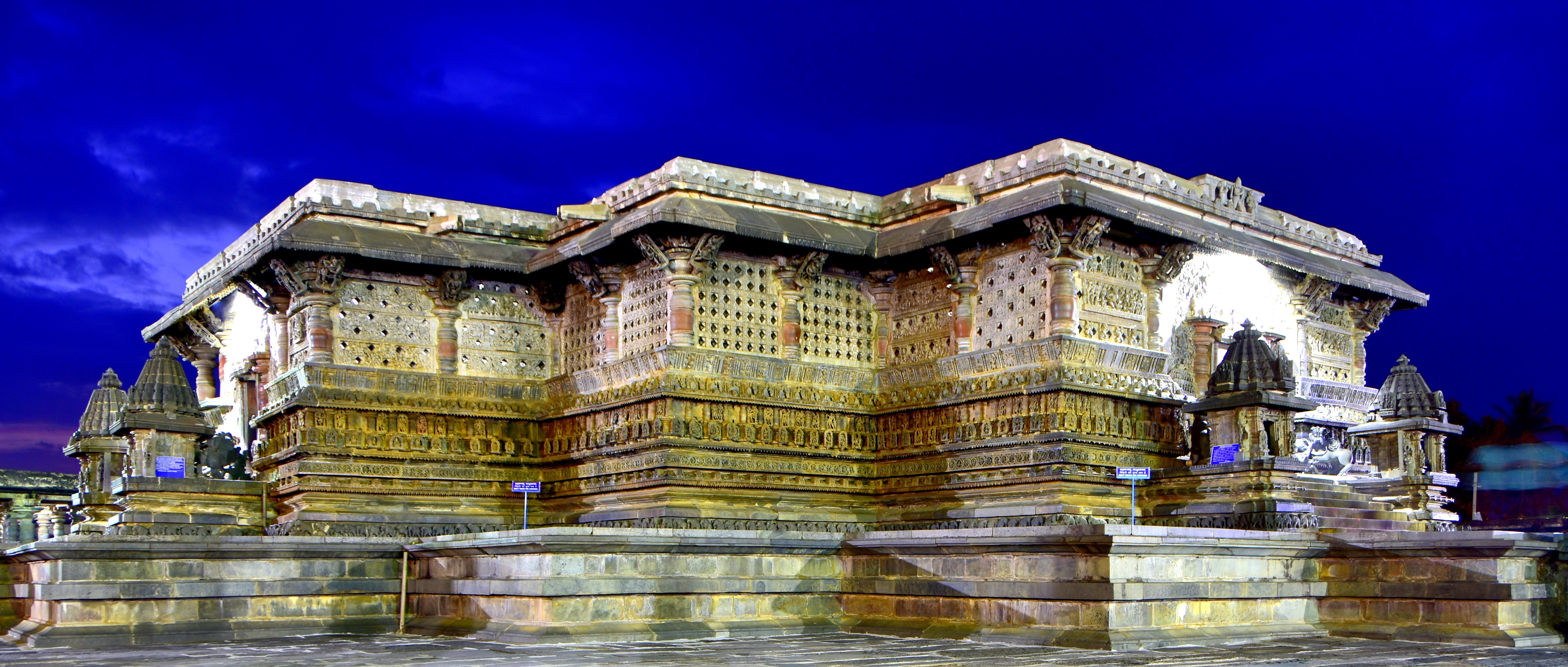

The temple is a ekakuta vimana design (single shrine) of 10.5 m by 10.5 m size. It combines elements of North Indian Nagara and South Indian Karnata style architecture. The temple stands on an open and wide platform designed to be a circumambulatory path around the sanctum. The temple and platform were without walls and the platform surrounded an open mantapa, following the contour of the temple. A visitor would have been able to see the ornate pillars of the open mantapa from the platform. Later walls and stone screens were added, creating an enclosed vestibule and mantapa, providing security but creating too much dark to appreciate the artwork inside. The vestibule connects the circumambulatory platform to the mandapa (hall). There is intricate and abundant artwork both on the outside and inside the temple.

The temple has a simple Hoysala plan and features one sanctum. The building material used in the Chennakesava temple is chloritic schist, more commonly known as soapstone. It is soft when quarried and allows artists to more easily carve details. Over time the material hardens. This Hoysala temple, according to the art critic and historian Settar, deployed the Western Chalukyan artists and their tradition that originally developed in Aihole, Badami and Pattadakal. It is simpler than later Hoysala temples (including the Hoysaleswara temple at Halebidu and the Keshava temple at Somanathapura).

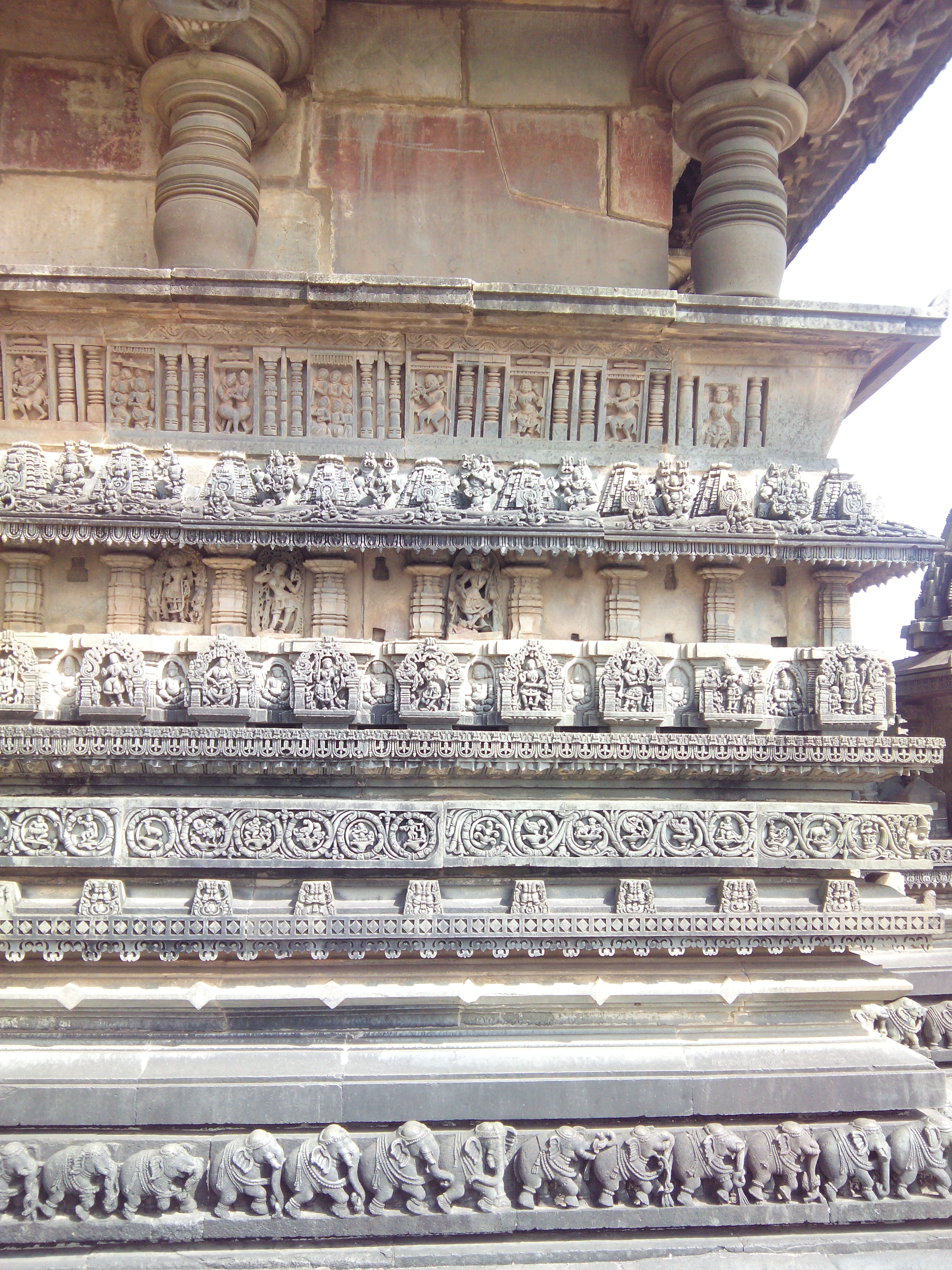
Bands of carvings on one side of the circumambulatory platform.

==== Platform ====
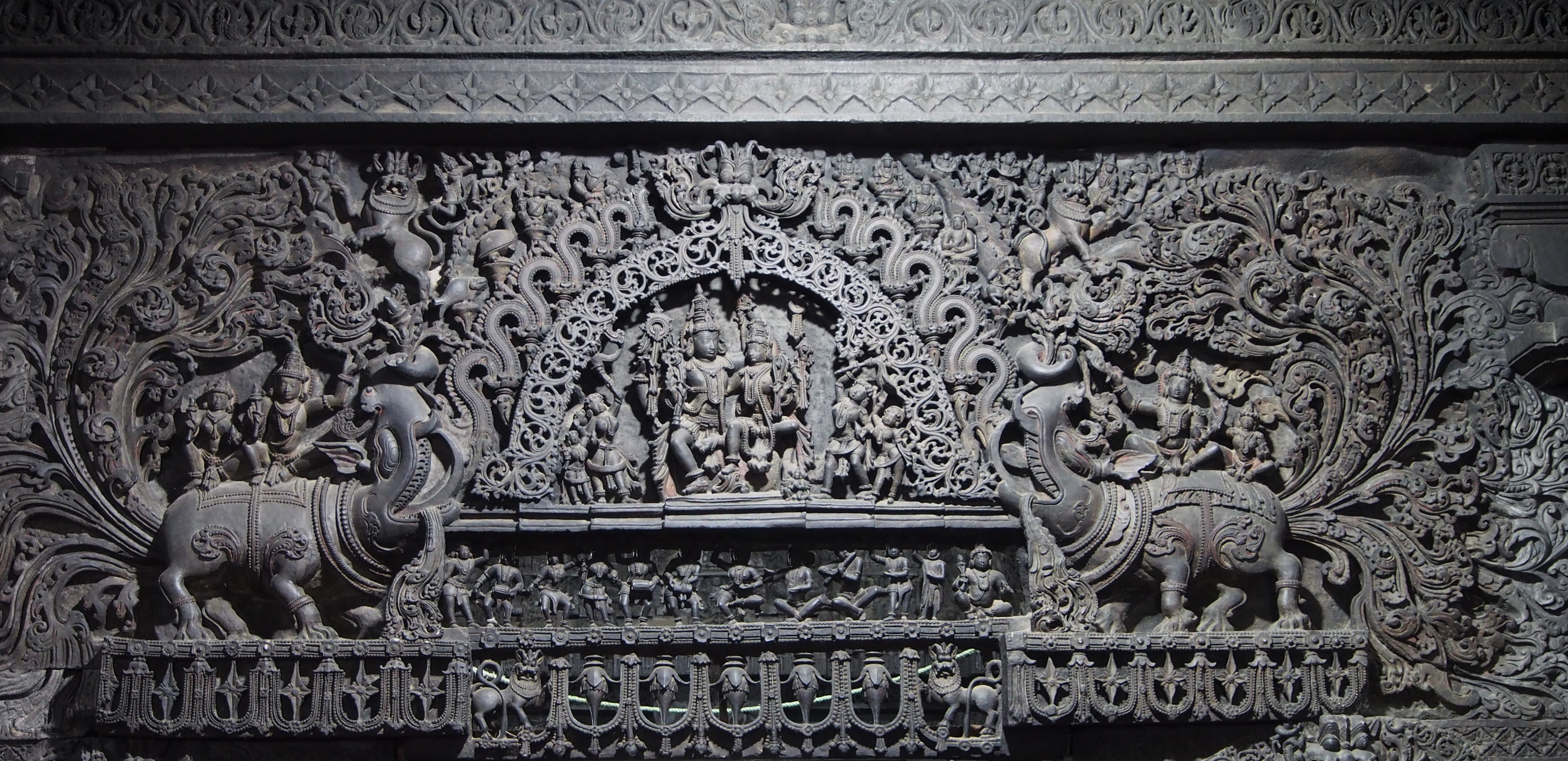
Celestial deity with mythical animals carved at the entrance

The temple is built on a jagati (literally, "worldly"), a symbolic worldly platform with a wide walking space for circumambulation (pradakshina-patha). There is one flight of steps leading to the jagati and another flight of steps into the mantapa. The jagati provides the devotee the opportunity to do a pradakshina around the temple before entering it. The jagati carefully follows the staggered square design of the mantapa and the star shape of the shrine.

==== Exterior walls ====
The visitor sees numerous artwork during the circumambulation of the temple over the jagati platform in horizontal bands. The bottom band is of elephants with different expressions, as symbolic supporters of the entire structure. Above it is an empty layer, followed by cornice work with a periodic lion face. Above it is another band of scroll and then cornice band, except at the back of the temple where a row of horsemen in various riding positions are depicted.

The fifth carved band is of small figurines, mostly females with various expressions facing the viewer, while periodically the band includes Yakshas who face towards the inside of the temple. This layer also has numerous dancers and musicians, as well as professionals with their tools. The band above has pilasters between some of which are carved secular figures mostly females and couples. A nature and creepers band wraps the temple above the pilaster band, with scenes of the Ramayana epic included in this band. Above this layer are scenes from common life depicting kama, artha and dharma. Included here are couples in courtship, eroticism and sexual scenes, followed by couples with children, economic and festive activities. Towards the north outer wall, friezes with scenes from the Mahabharata are portrayed.

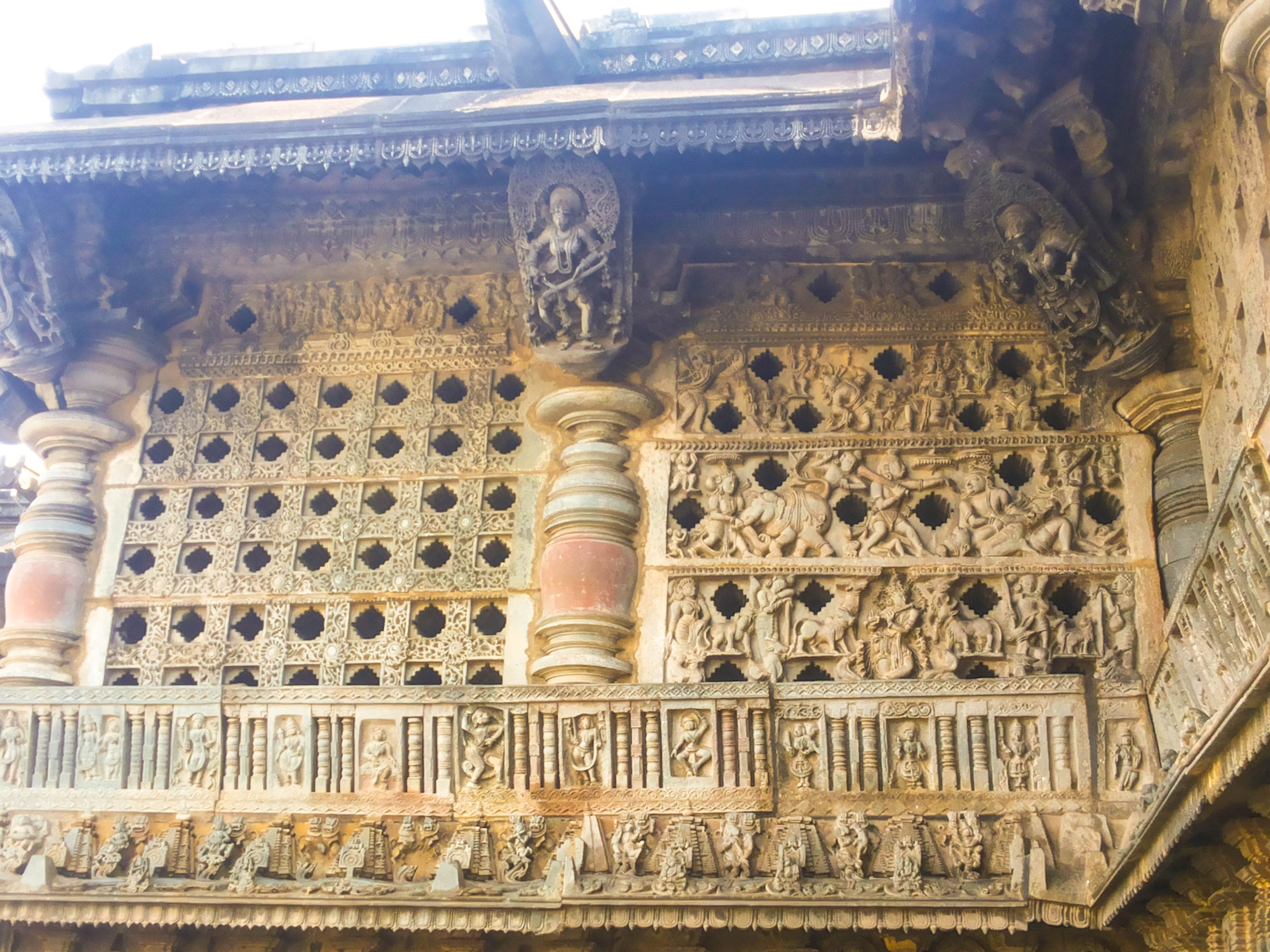
Two styles of light screens used in Kesava temple: geometric artwork (left) and Puranic stories artwork.

Above these bands is later construction that added 10 perforated stone windows and screens to north side and 10 to the south side of the temple. The later artists engraved Purana scenes in ten of these later additions, and the other ten have geometric floral designs. The perforated screens with characters show:

- Hoysala court scene, with the king, queen, officers, attendants and two gurus with their students
- Kesava with Hanuman and Garuda,
- the Vamana dwarf, Bali and Trivikrama legend,
- the Krishna Kaliyamardana legend, Shiva on Nandi with Ganesha and Kartikeya,
- the Prahlada, Hiranyakashipu and Narasimha legend (notable for Thenkalai namam style Urdhava pundra symbols on Prahlada's forehead),
- Yoga-Narasimha with Hanuman and Garuda,
- the Samudra manthan legend,
- the Krishna killing Kamsa legend,
- Ranganatha reclining on Sesha,
- the Hanuman and Garuda fighting over Shiva linga legend.

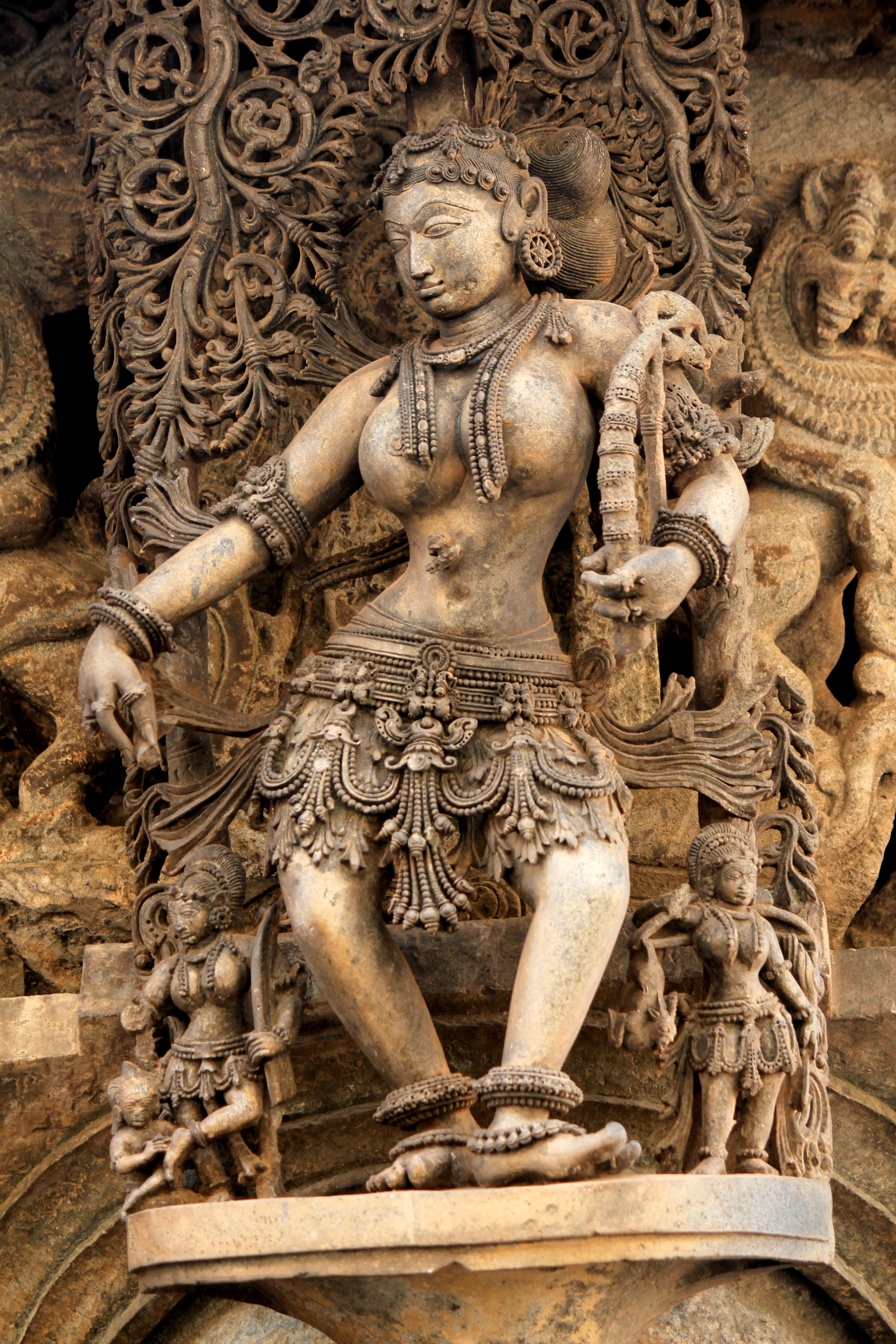
Statues on capital support the temple eaves. 38 of the original 40 have survived in Belur.

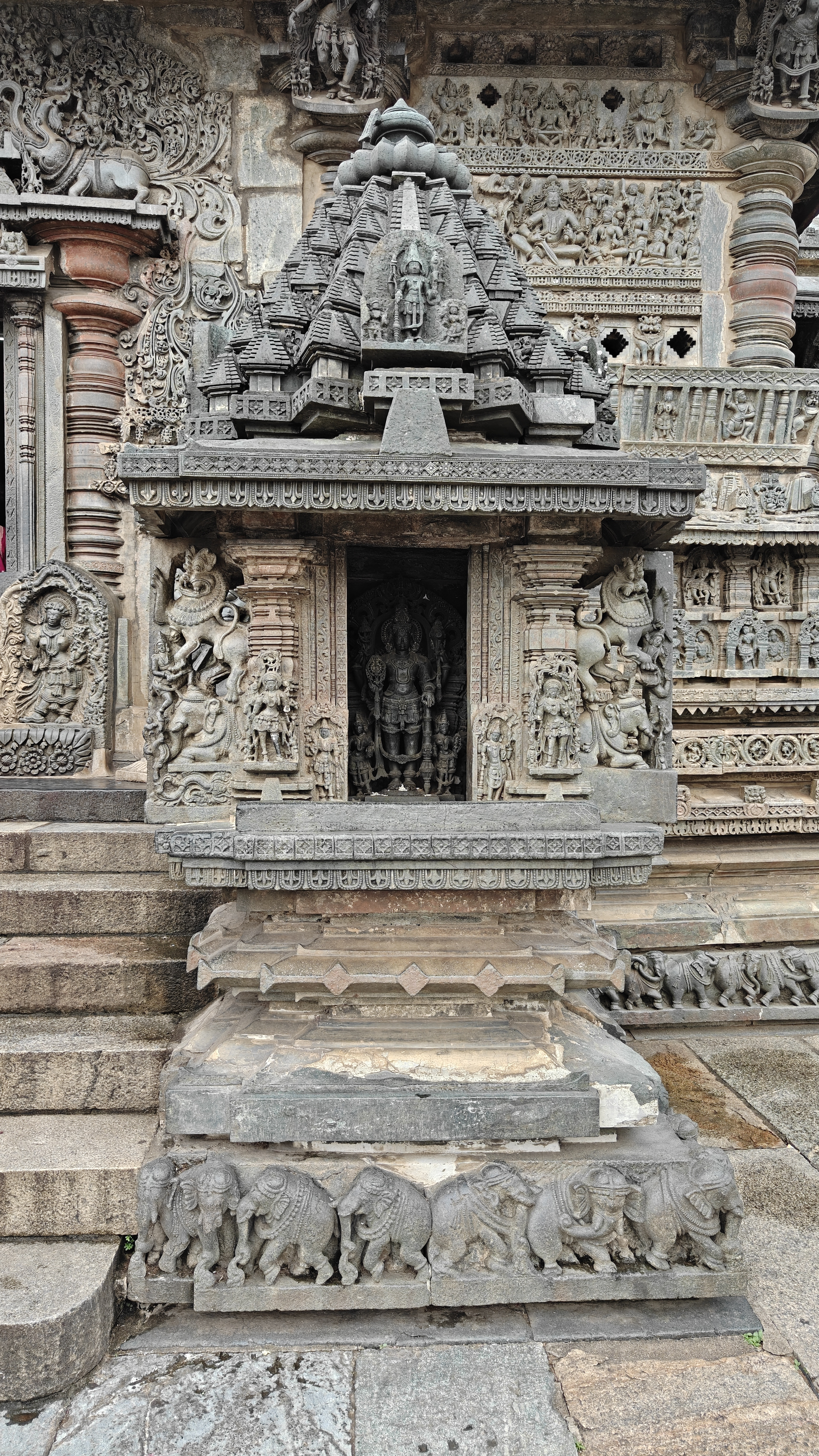
Statue of the deity's guardian and carvings outside the main temple.

Above the perforated screens, on capitals of the supporting pillars, are madanakai (Salabhanjika) figures. There were originally 40 madanakai, of which 38 have survived in damaged or good form. Two of these are Durga, three huntresses (with bow), others are dancers in Natya Shastra abhinaya mudra (acting posture), musicians, women dressing or doing make up, a woman with a pet parrot, men making music. A majority of these madanakai figures are also carved into miniatures in the sixth band of the outer wall around the pradakshina patha.

The wall also features 80 large reliefs around the temple. Of these 32 are of Vishnu, 9 of his avatars (Narasimha, Varaha, Vamana, Ranganatha, Balarama); 4 of Shiva in various forms including Nataraja (with or without Parvati); 2 of Bhairava (Shiva); 2 of Harihara (half Shiva, half Vishnu); 4 of Surya (Sun god); 5 of Durga and Mahishasuramardini; 1 of Kama and Rati; 1 of Ganesha, Brahma, Saraswati, Garuda and Chandra. Other major reliefs are of Arjuna shooting an arrow to win Draupadi; Ravana lifting the Kailasha; Daksha, Bali and Sukracharya.

Some of the statues present exceptional details. For example, one madanakai figure is shown with a fruit tree canopy, where a small fly is shown sitting on the fruit and nearby a lizard is preparing to pounce on the fly. In another, an eagle is shown attacking a sarabha, which in turn is attacking a lion, which in turn is pouncing on an elephant, which itself is seizing a snake, which in turn is shown in the act of swallowing a rat – a sight that includes a pondering sage. Secular life is shown in these images, such as an artist making a drawing or musicians lost in their music. A notable image is the depiction of 12th century Rudra-vina and a Lasya dance posture. Also included is the image of a Jina of Jainism.

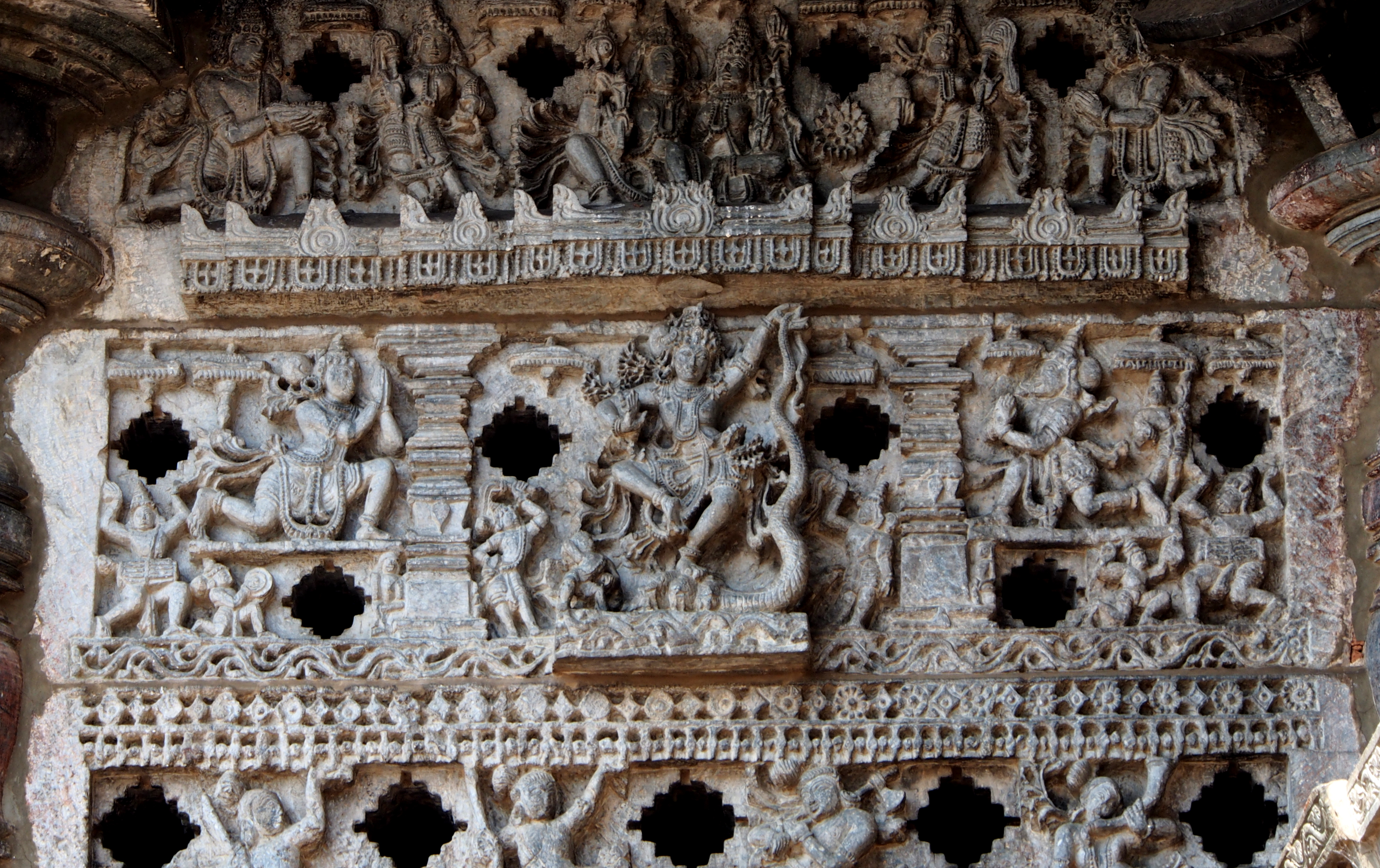
Stone grill in design

The outer wall on the side of the eastern entrance into the temple inside shows Bhairava and Durga. The outer wall on the side of the southern entrance into the temple shows Tandavesvara and Brahmani. The outer sides at the northern entrance into the temple show Vishnu and Mahishasuramardini.

==== Interior ====
The Chennakesava temple has three entrances and their doorways have decorated sculptures called dvarapalaka (doorkeepers) on either side. The central hall (navaranga) was originally open on all sides except the west where the sanctum is, but all sides were later closed with perforated screens. This reduced the amount of light significantly and the intricate art work is difficult to appreciate without secondary light. The artwork starts on entry to the three entrances to the hall. Each leads to raised verandas on both sides. The hall has carved pillars with a large domed ceiling in the center. The mandapa has 60 "bays" (compartments).

The navaranga in Kesava temple at Belur is the largest of any Hoysala temple, is of triratha diamond-shaped layout, according to James Harle.

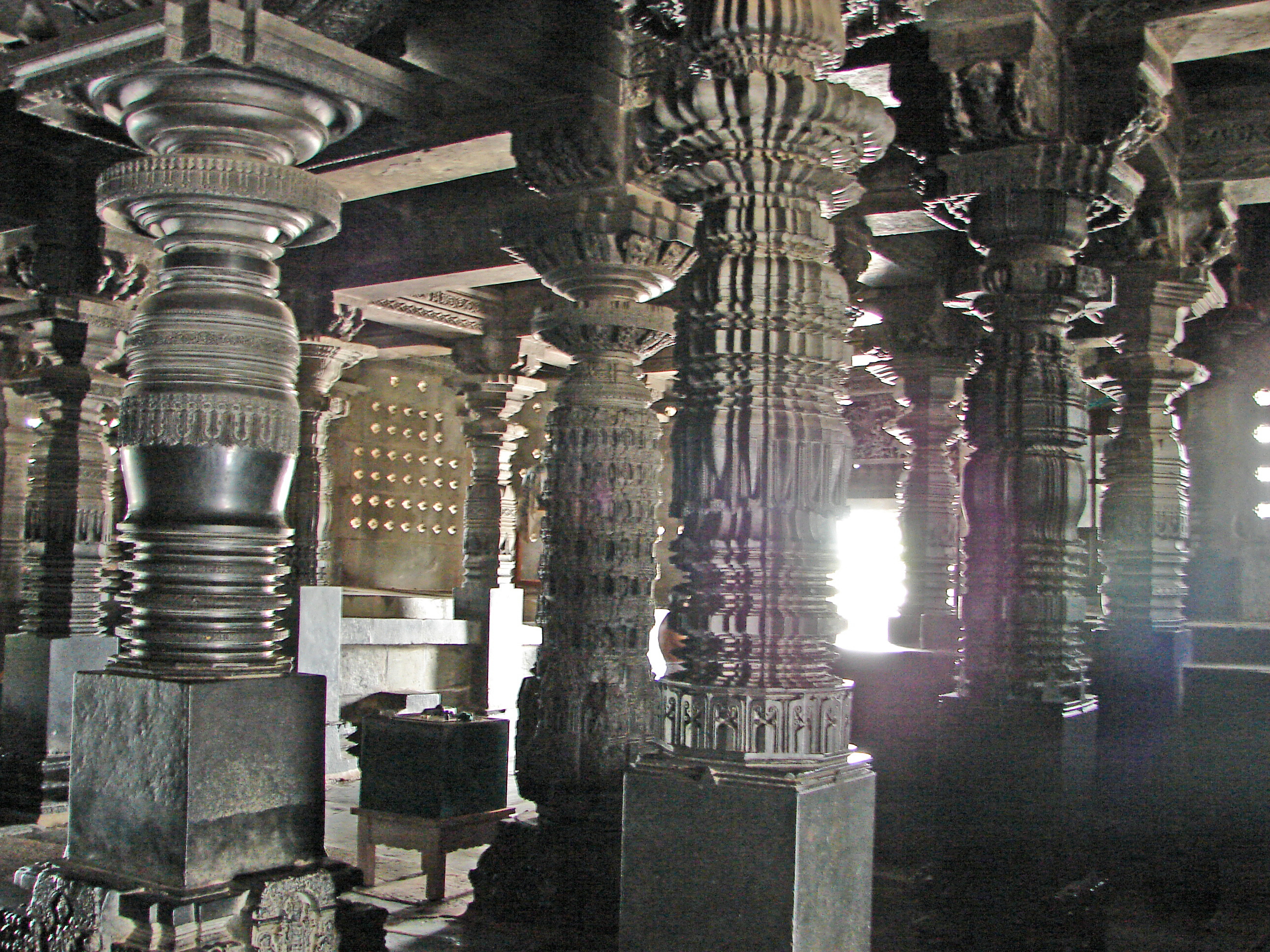
Ornate lathe turned pillars in mantapa.

==== Pillars and ceiling ====
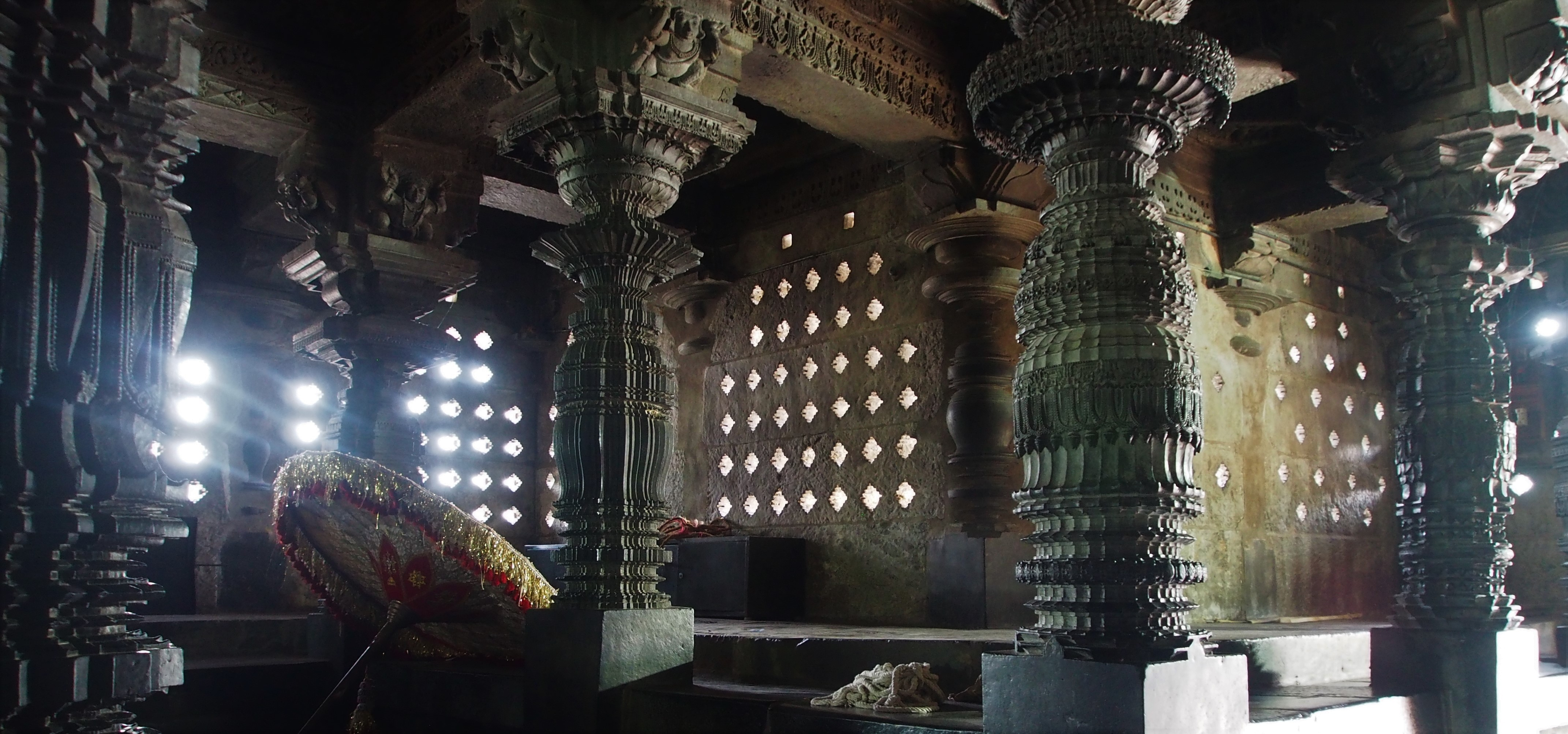
Sanctum Sanctorum with stone grills and pillars.

The navaranga hall has forty eight pillars. All except the central four are carved in a unique way. The central four are later additions, added in 1381 CE during the Vijayanagara Empire era, to support the internal structure of a damaged temple. The pillars are of three sizes. Two pillars are particularly notable. One is the so-called Narasimha pillar which is carved with miniature figures from top to bottom, such as a tiny bull (kadale basava). The local legend states that this pillar once could rotate because of how it was supported, but it no longer can be rotated. The other pillar is the Mohini pillar. Other than the female avatar of Vishnu, the pillar has eight bands of carvings, including those of Brahma, Vishnu, Shiva, then ten avatars of Vishnu, the eight direction deities, mythical animals with the body of a lion but the face of other wildlife. The four central pillars are notable for having been hand carved while the others were lathe turned.

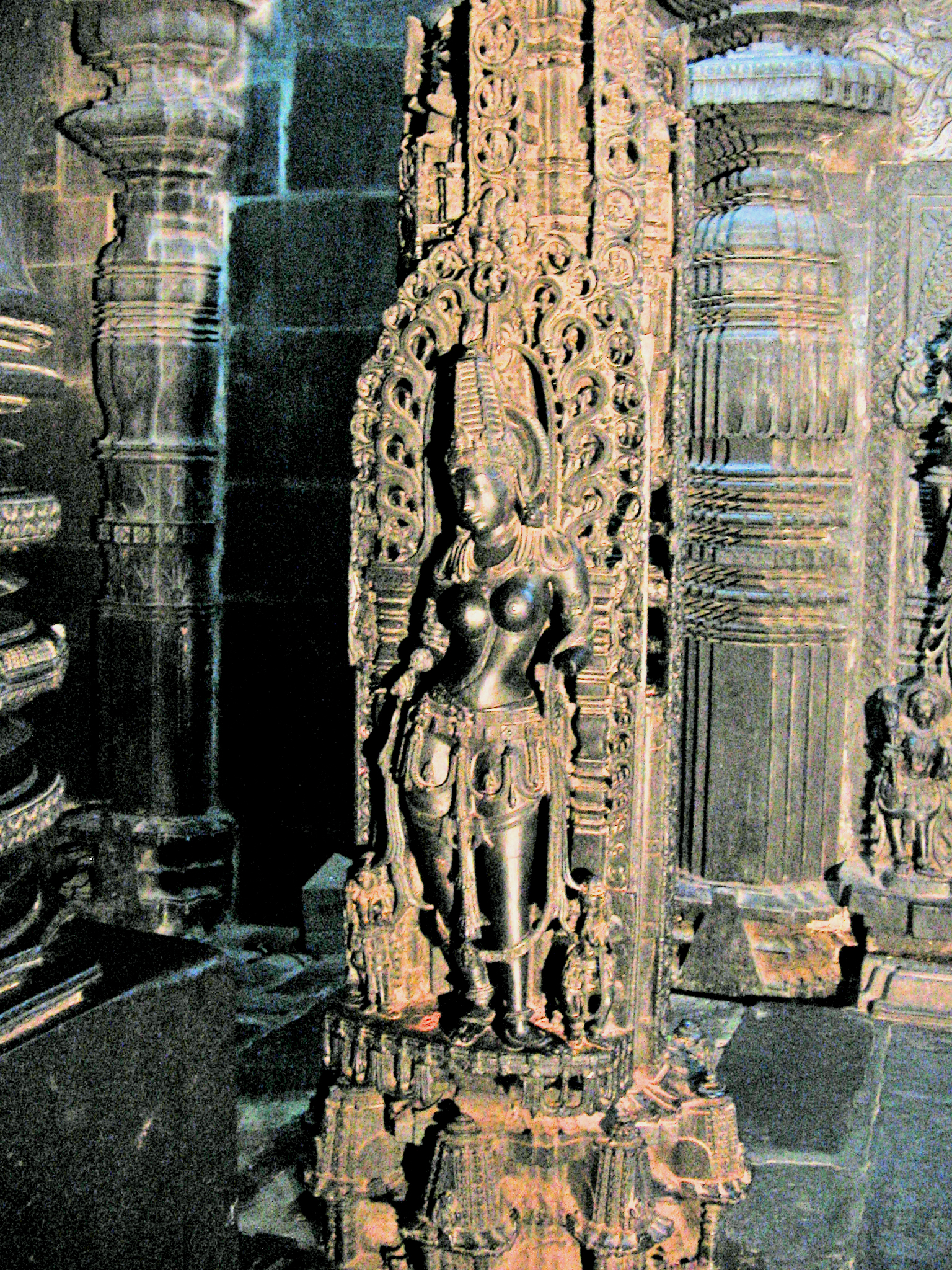
The temple is famous for its rendering of Mohini, the female avatar of Vishnu.

In the center of the hall is a large open square, above which is a domed ceiling about 10 feet in diameter and 6 feet deep. At the top is a lotus bud with Brahma, Vishnu and Shiva carved on it. At the bottom of the dome is a series of friezes with the Ramayana story. On the capitals of the four pillars are madanikas (Salabhanjika). One represents dancing Saraswati, the Hindu god of knowledge, arts and music. The others are regular dancers, but with different expressions. One is dressing her hair, the other in a Natya posture, and the fourth has a parrot seated on her hand. The head and neck jewelry made of rock are freely mounted and can be moved. The bracelets similarly are moveable. The design of the ceiling follows the Hindu texts, and is a modified utksipta style with images placed in concentric rings.

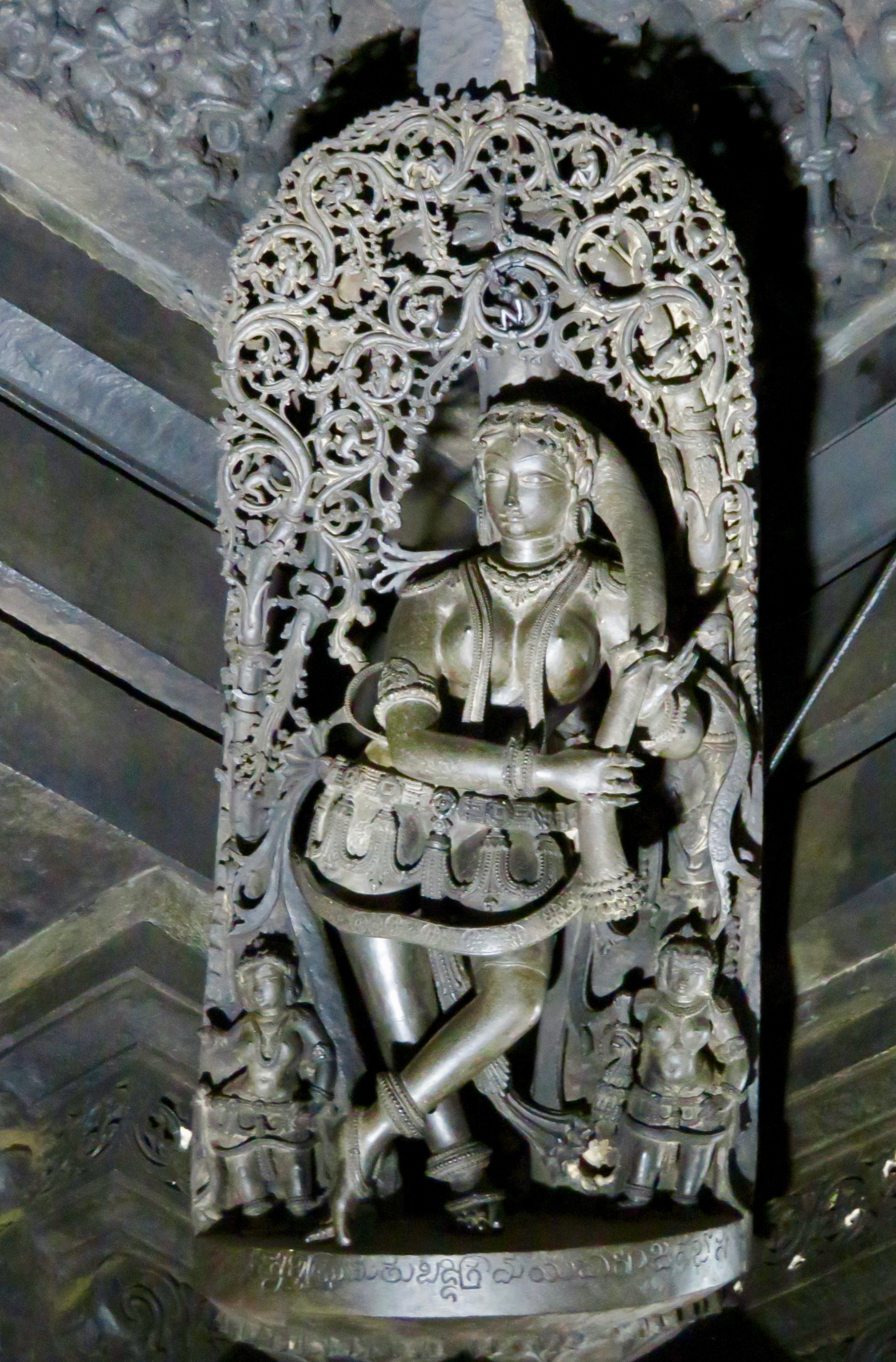
One of four ceiling dome madanikas, with an inscription on pedestal.

Other reliefs inside the hall include large images of Vishnu avatars, friezes of the Vedic and Puranic histories, and more scenes of the Ramayana.

==== Sanctum ====
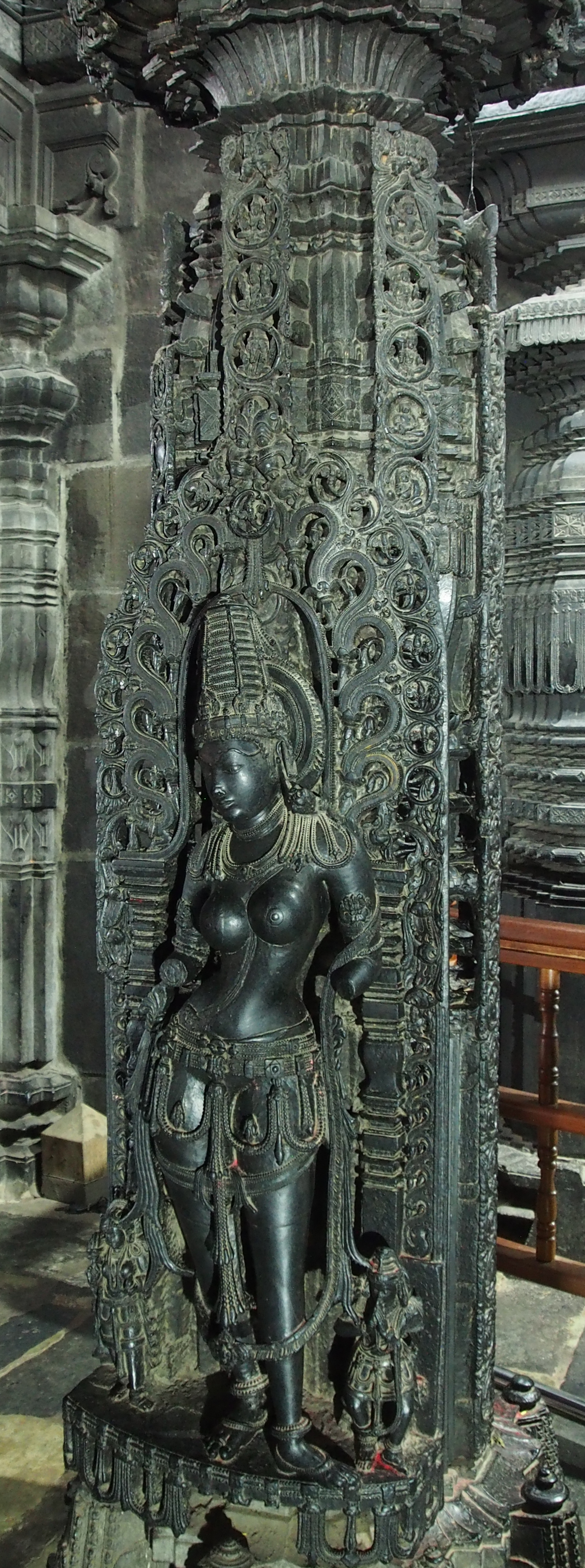
Intricately carved damsel on a pillar at the Sanctum Sanctorum.

The mandapa leads to the garbha griya past the pillars and a doorway. The door is flanked by dvarapala, Jaya and Vijaya. Its pediment has Lakshminarayana in center. Below it are musicians playing 12th-century musical instruments. On the side are two makaras with Varuna and Varuni together riding on them. Inside the square sanctum is the image of Keshava, or as inscriptions call it "Vijayanarayana". It stands on a 3 feet high pedestal, is about 6 feet high with a halo. It has four hands, with chakra and shankha in the upper hands and a gada and lotus in his lower hands. The halo has cyclical carving of the ten avatars of Vishnu – Matsya, Kurma, Varaha, Narasimha, Vamana, Parasurama, Rama, Krishna, Buddha and Kalki. The temple is active house of worship, with Keshava dressed and decorated, priests present and devotees doing darshana.

=== Superstructure ===
The temple had a tower, which was repeatedly damaged and destroyed, rebuilt and restored. In the 19th-century restorations, the temple was left without a tower. According to Foekema, the tower when it existed would have been of the Bhumija style when it existed and not the regular star shaped tower that followed the shape of the vimana. The Bhumija towers, which are intact on the miniature shrines at the entrance of the hall are actually a type of nagara (North Indian) tower, being curvilinear in shape. This shape of tower is quite uncommon in pure Dravidian architecture.

=== Artists ===
Some of the Hoysala artists signed their work in the form of inscriptions. In doing so, they sometimes revealed details about themselves, their families, guilds and place of origin. Stone inscriptions and copper plate inscriptions provide more information about them. Ruvari Mallitamma was a prolific artist to whom more than 40 sculptures are attributed. Dasoja and his son Chavana who were from Balligavi in modern Shimoga district made important contributions. Chavana is credited with the work on five madanikas and Dasoja accomplished four of them. Malliyanna and Nagoja created birds and animals in their sculptures. Artists such as Chikkahampa and Malloja are credited with some of the sculptures in the mantapa. These artists also contributed to the artwork found in other major Hoysala temples found within 50 kilometers of Belur.

== Gallery ==
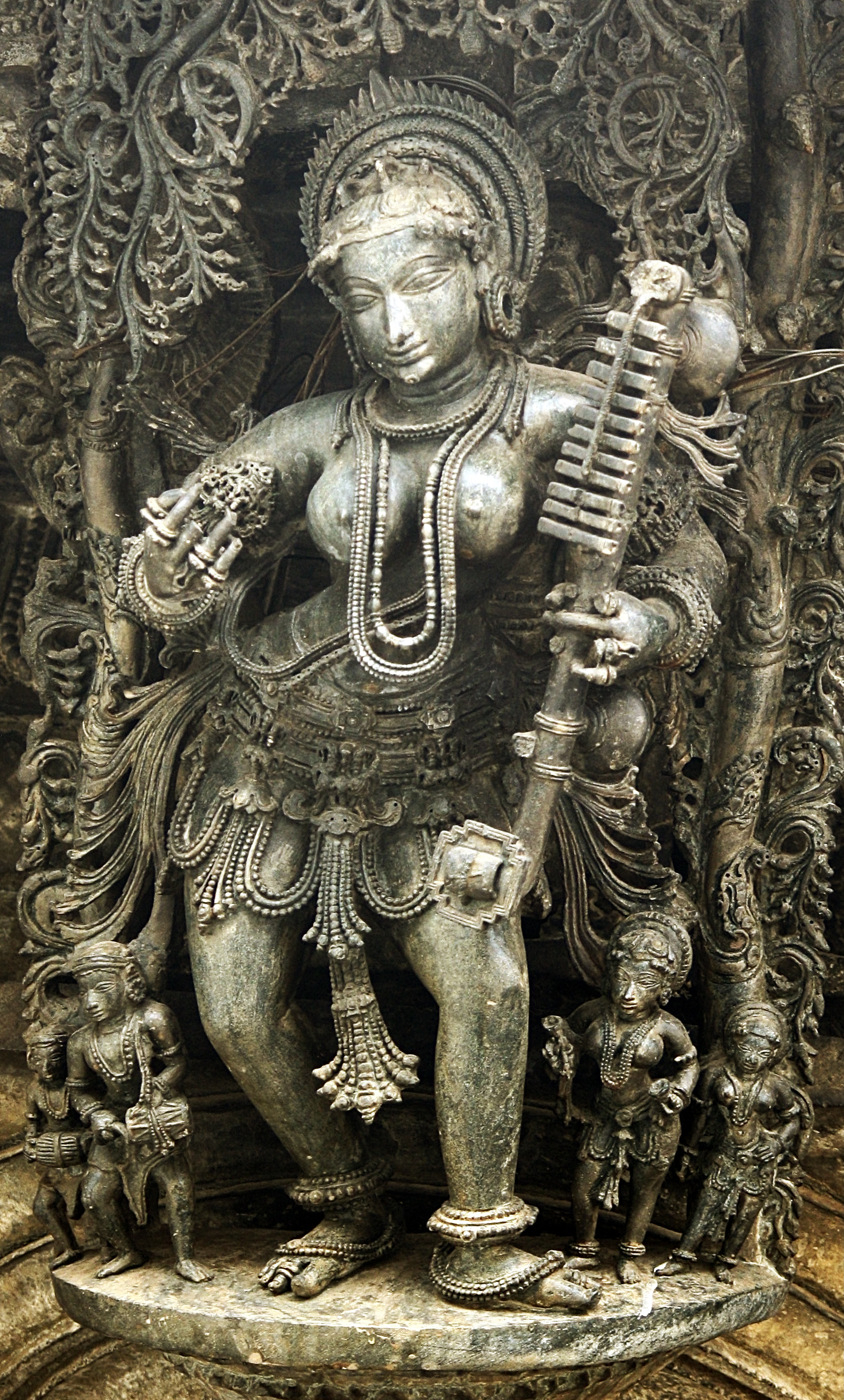
Musician playing Kinnari vina

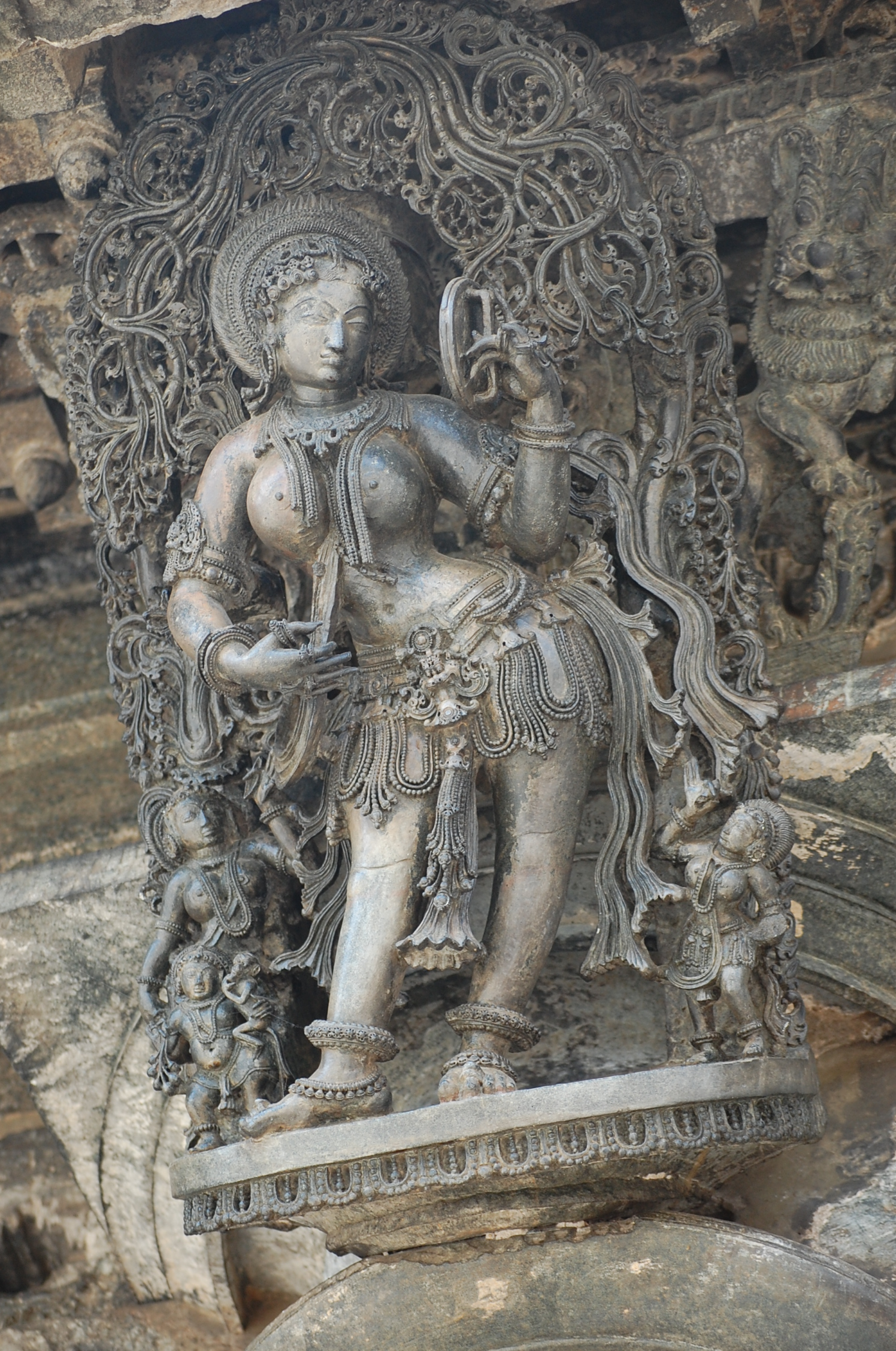
Shilabalika (celestial maiden) with mirror

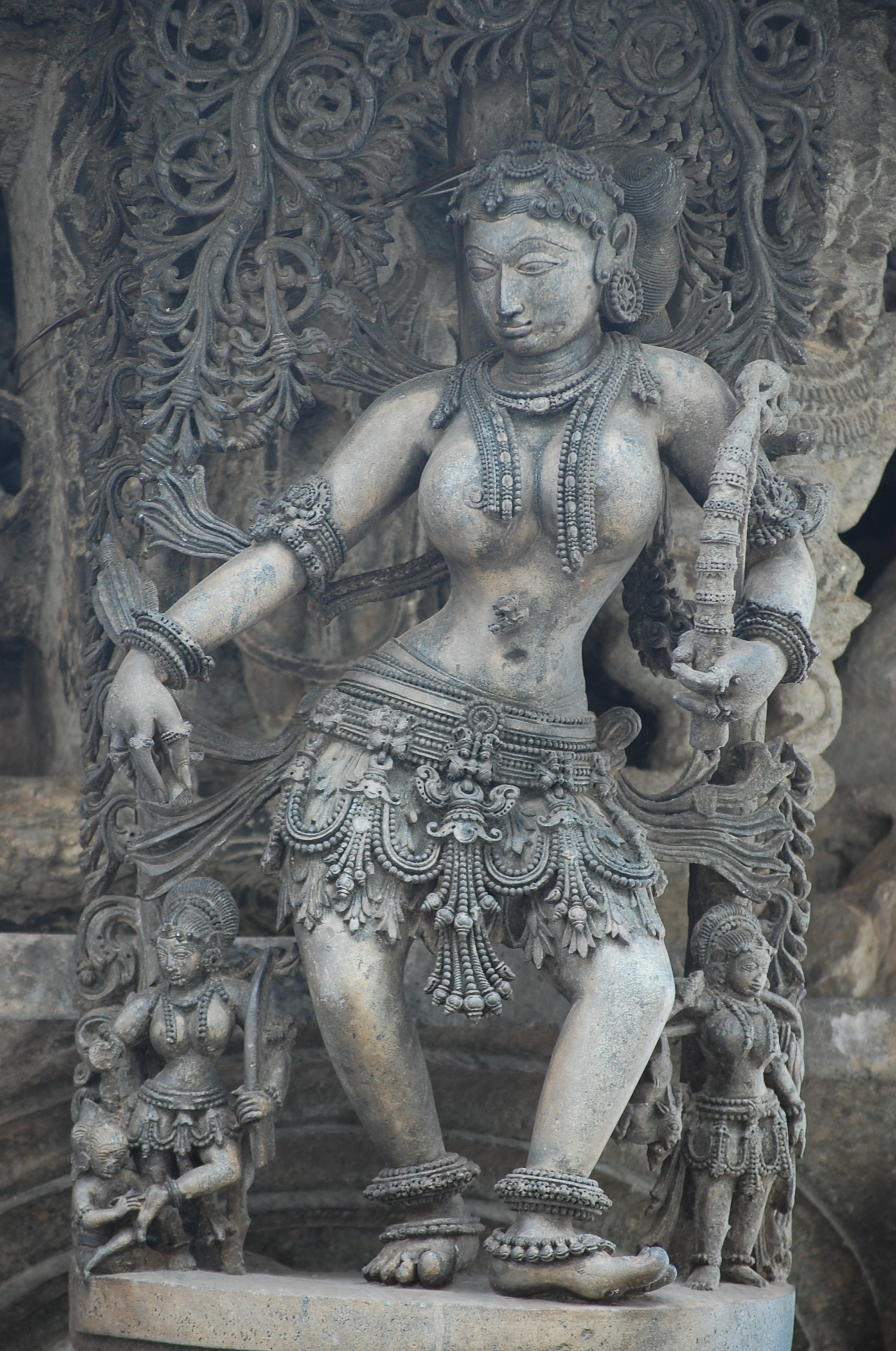
Shilabalika

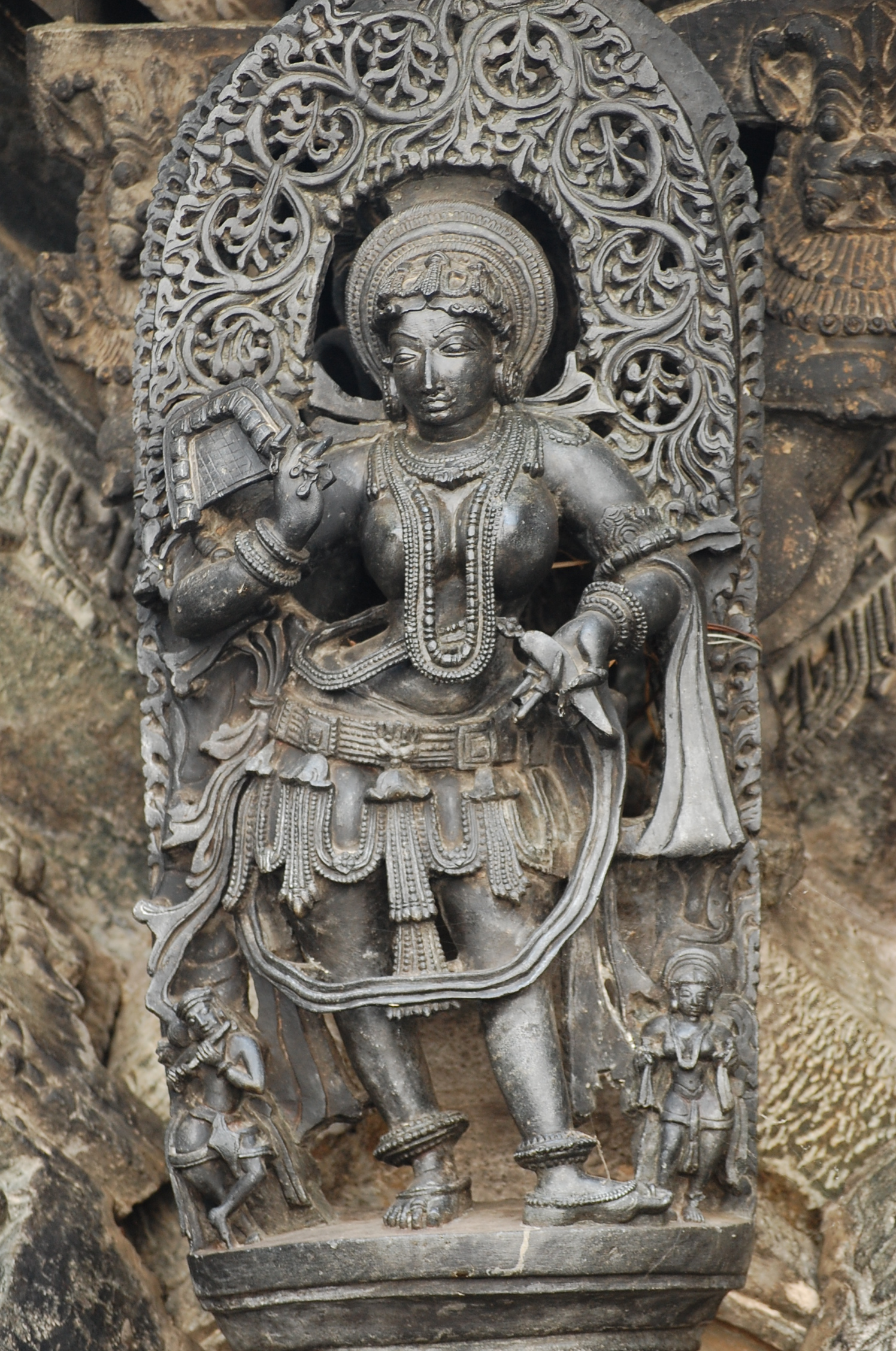
Shilabalika

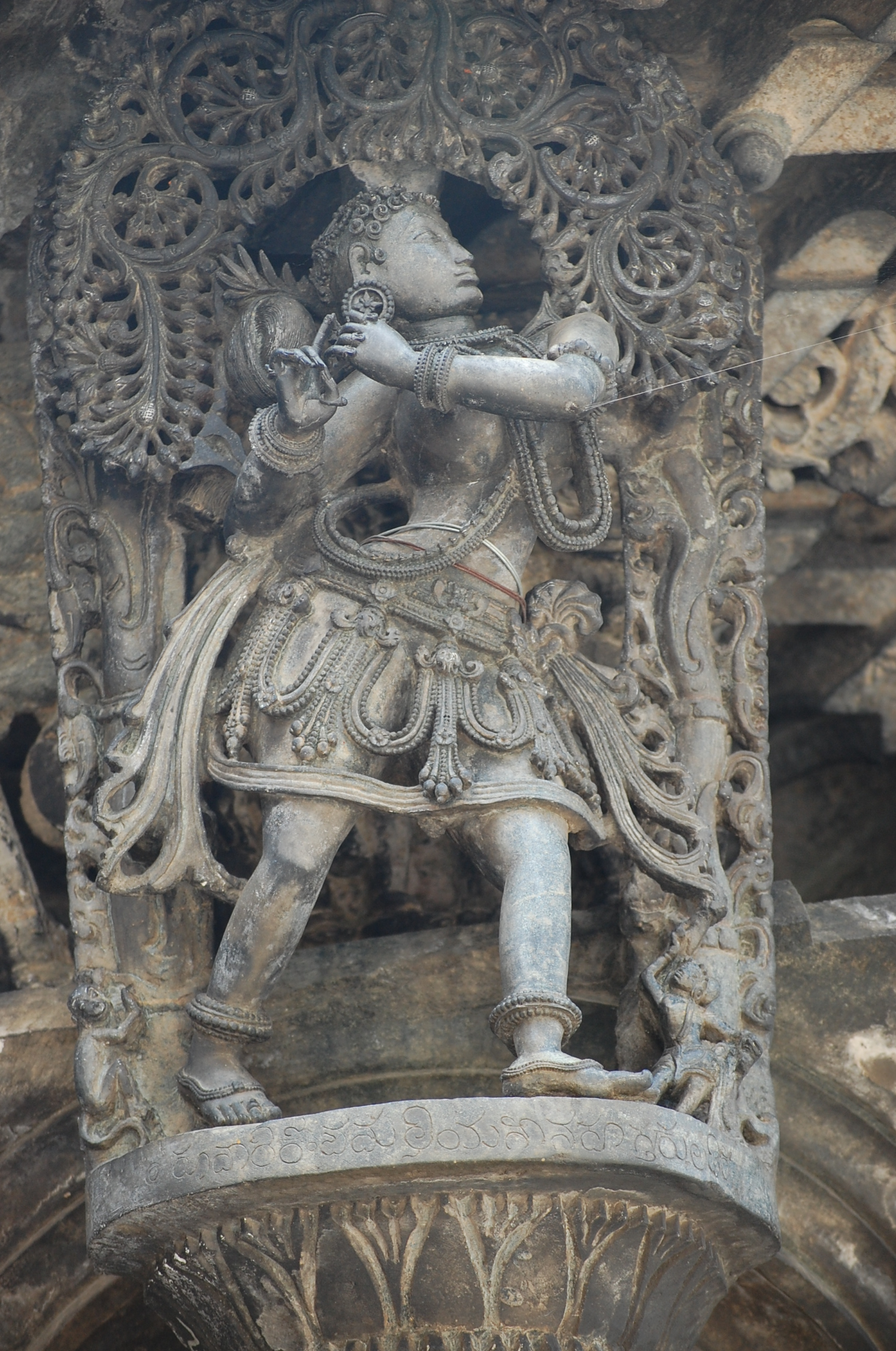
Shilabalika

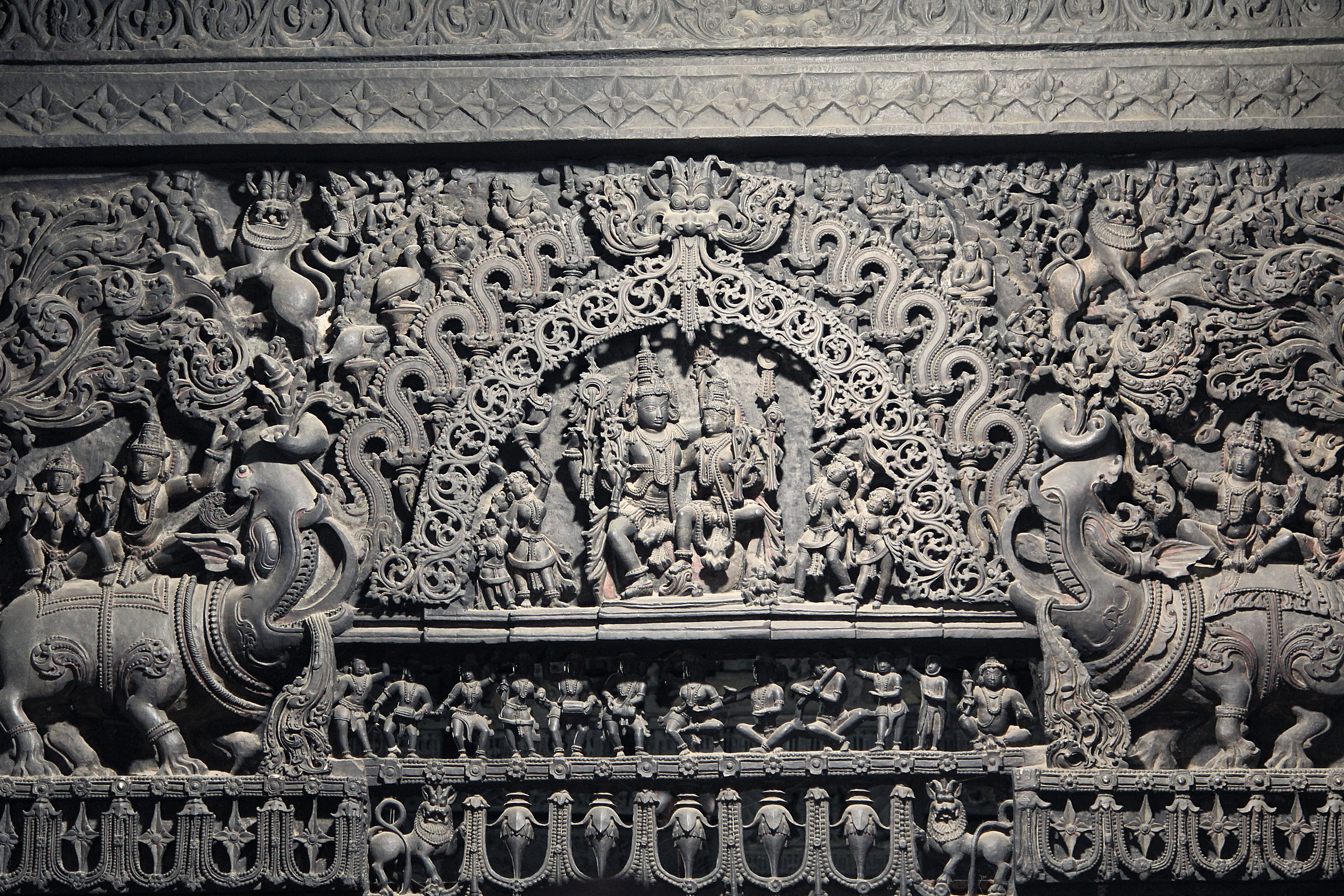
Lintel relief Sculpture at Channakeshava temple, Belur

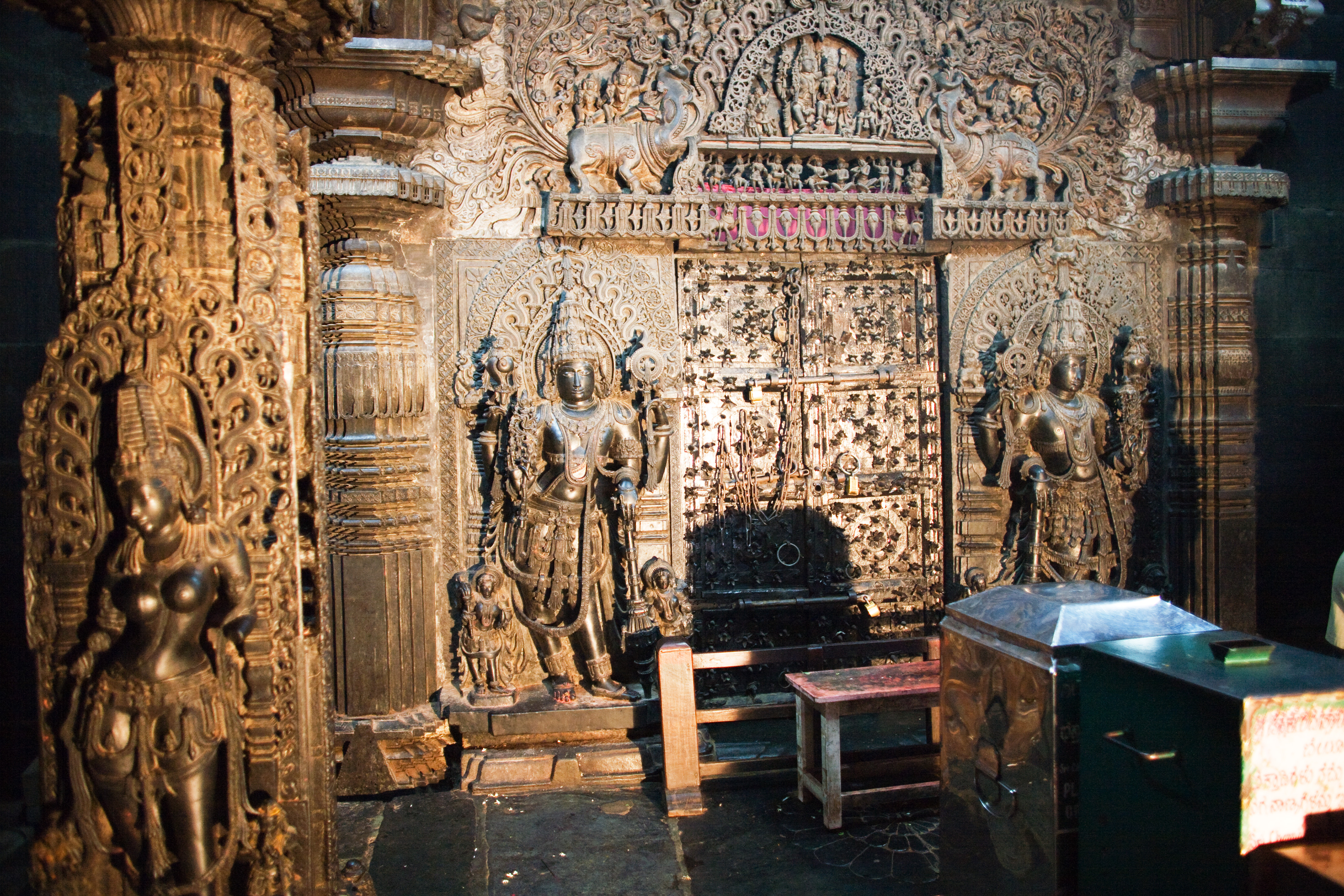
Jaya and Vijaya before the sanctum

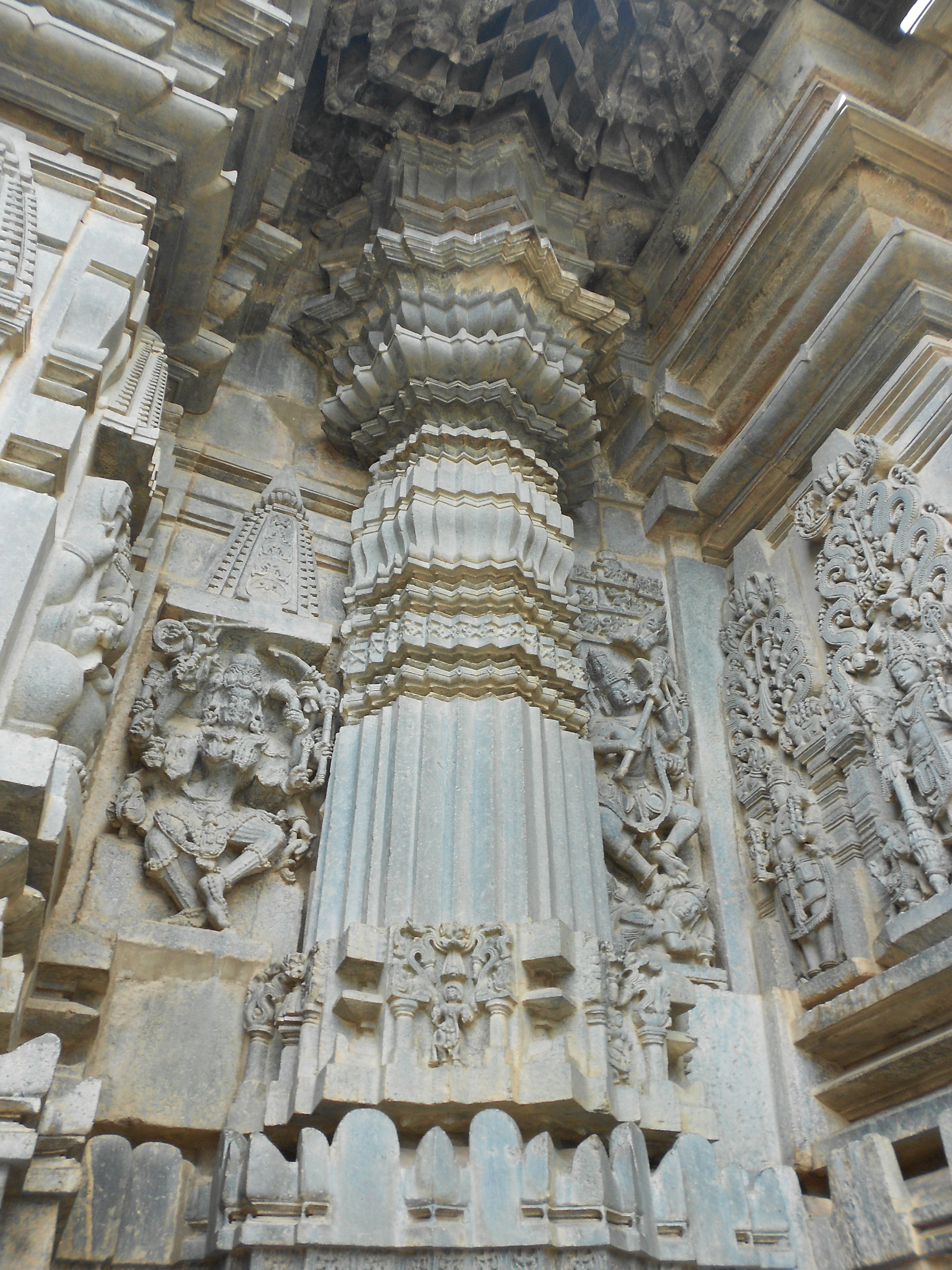
Decorative turret in relief art at Chennakeshava temple, Belur

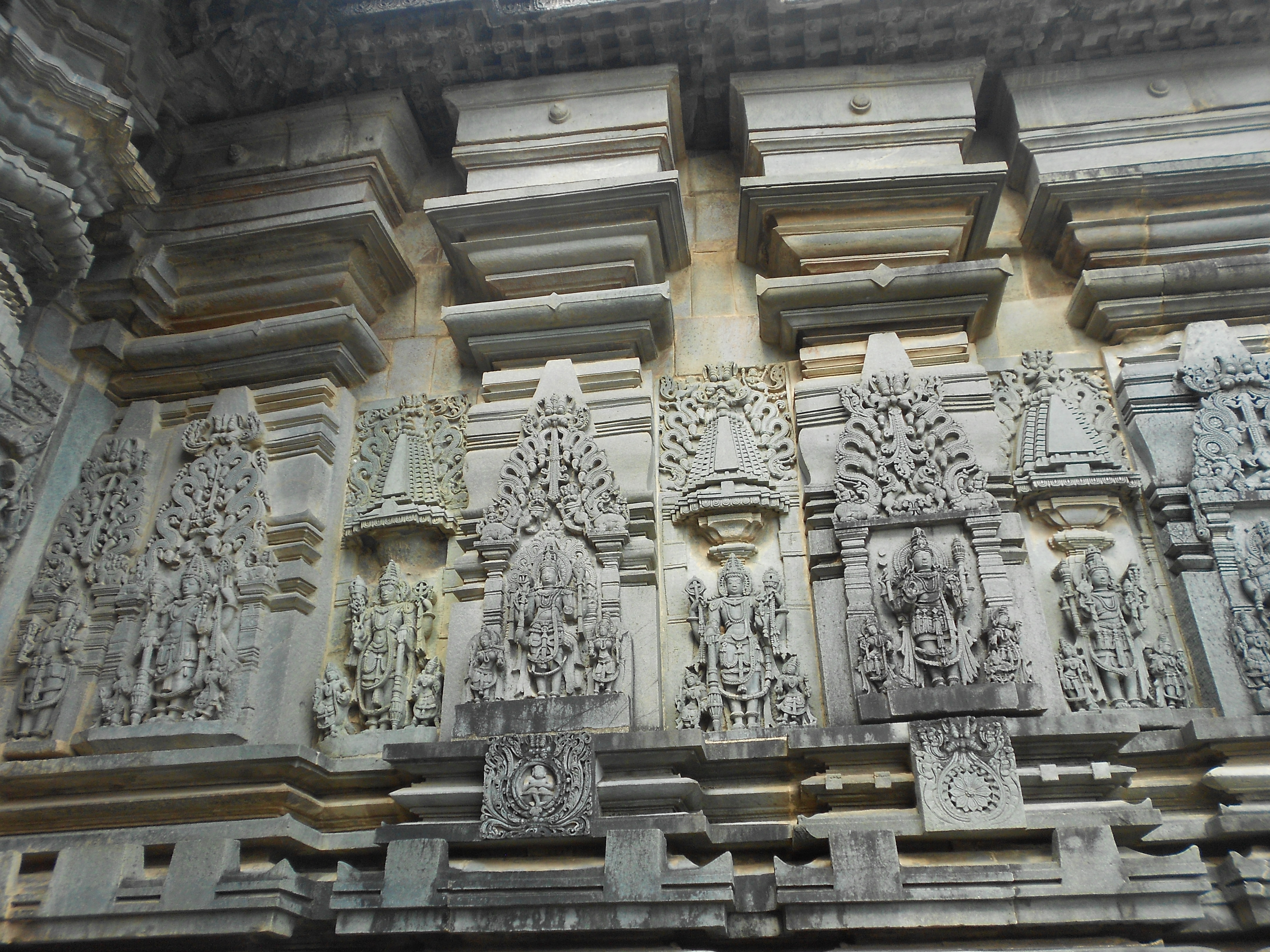
Decorative panel comprising miniature towers (aedicule)

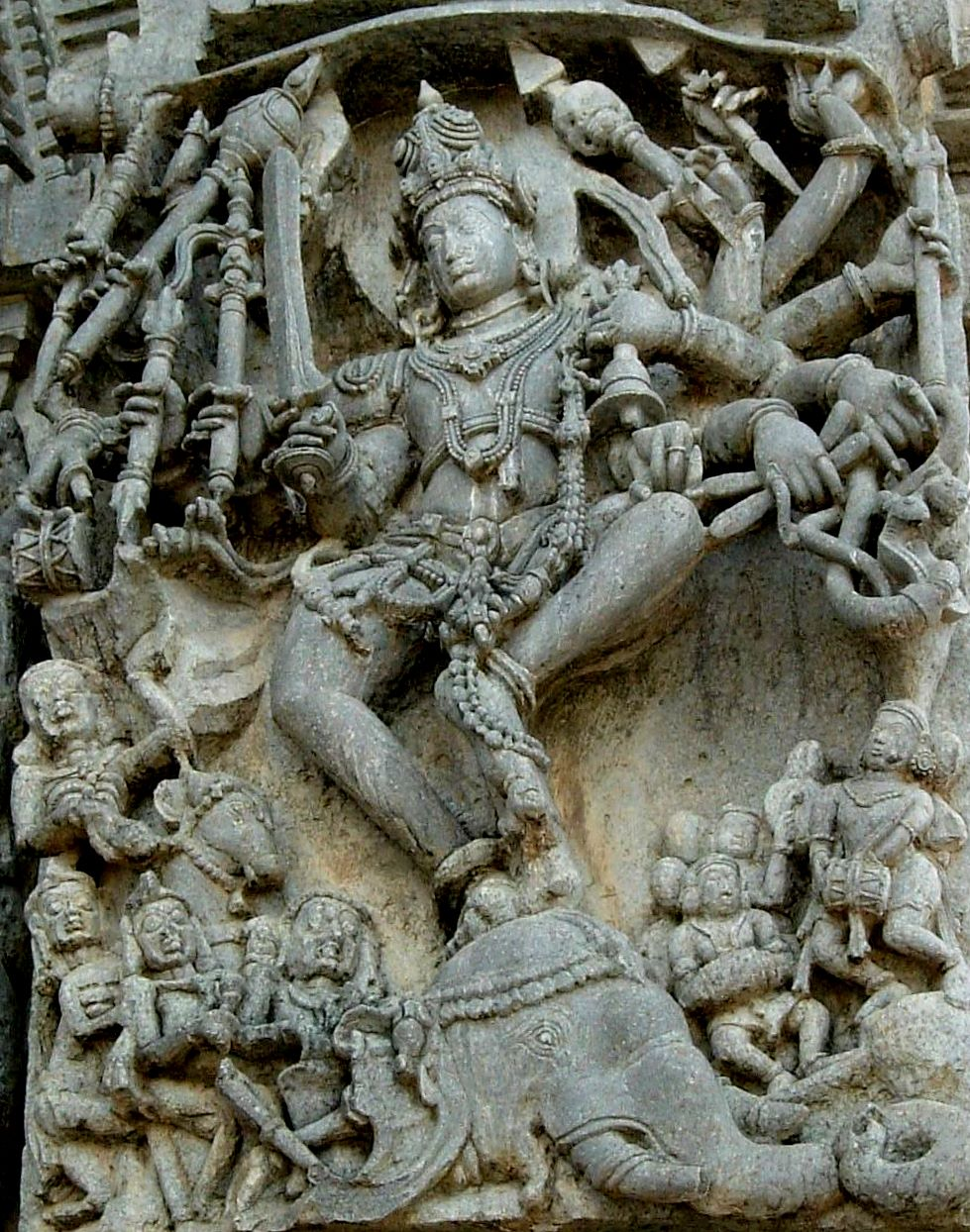
Gajasurasamhara: Shiva slaying the demon Gajasura.

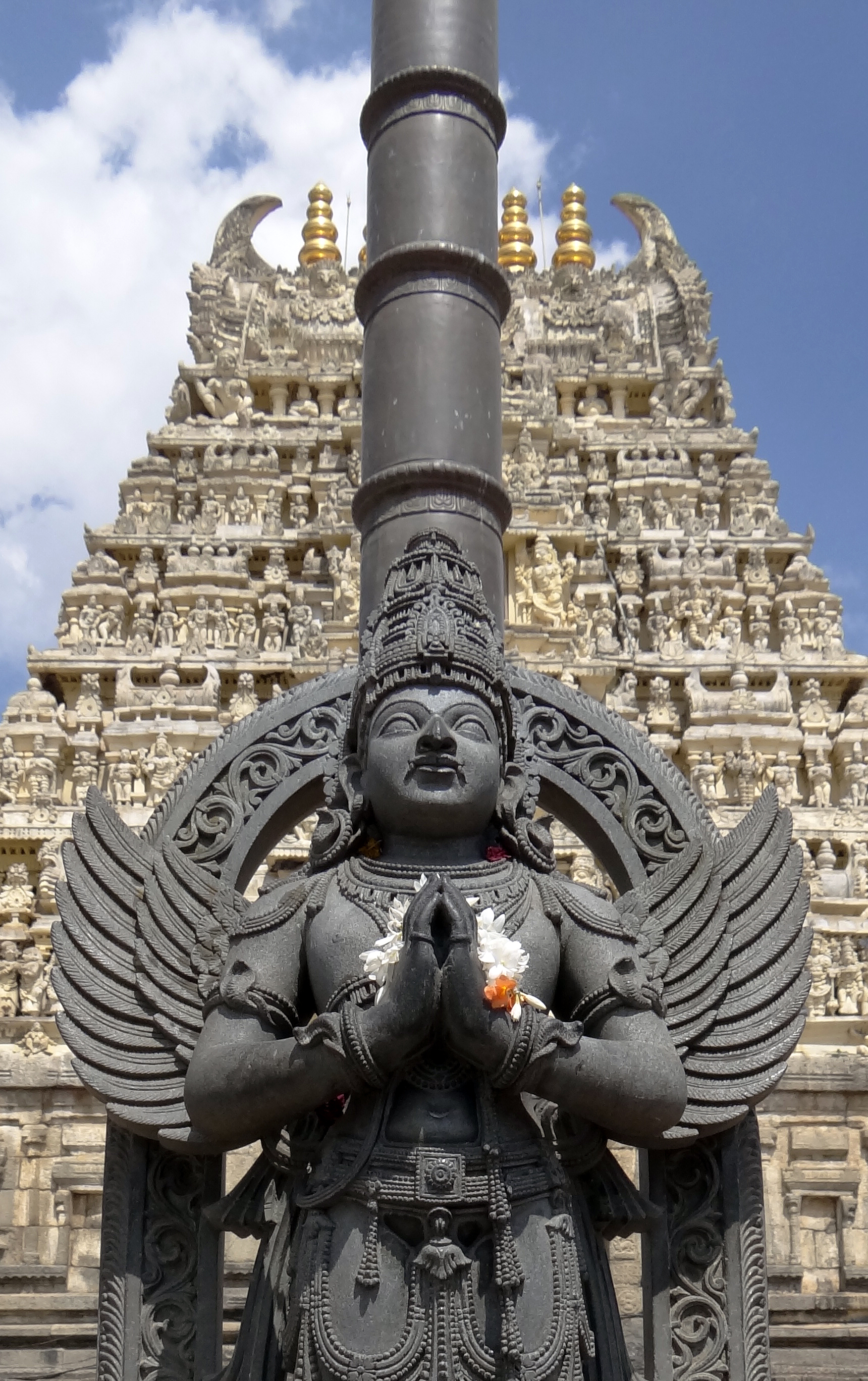
View of Gopura (tower over entrance) from Garuda stambha (pillar) at Chennakeshava temple complex, Belur

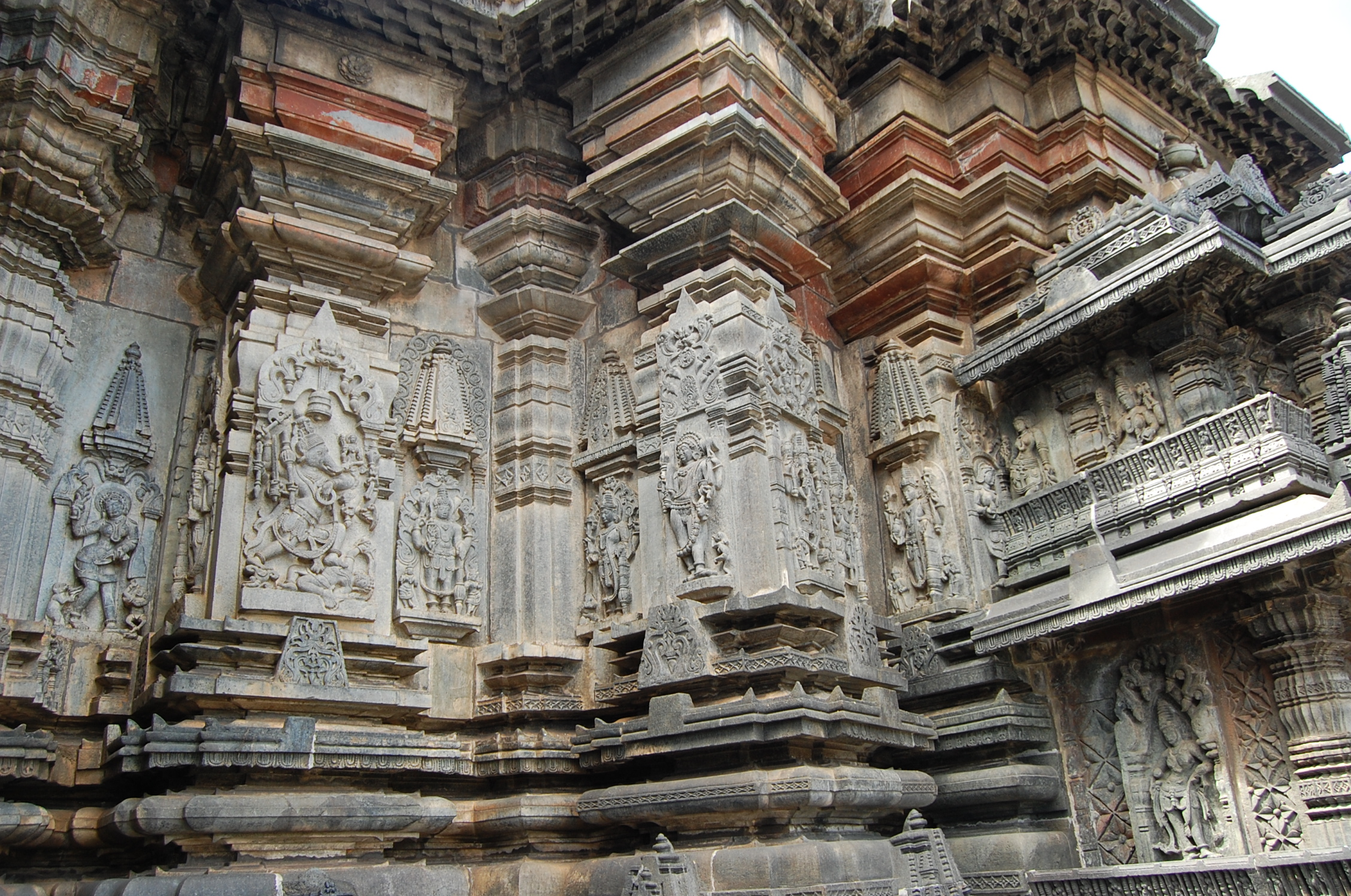
Shrine wall relief at Chennakeshava temple, Belur

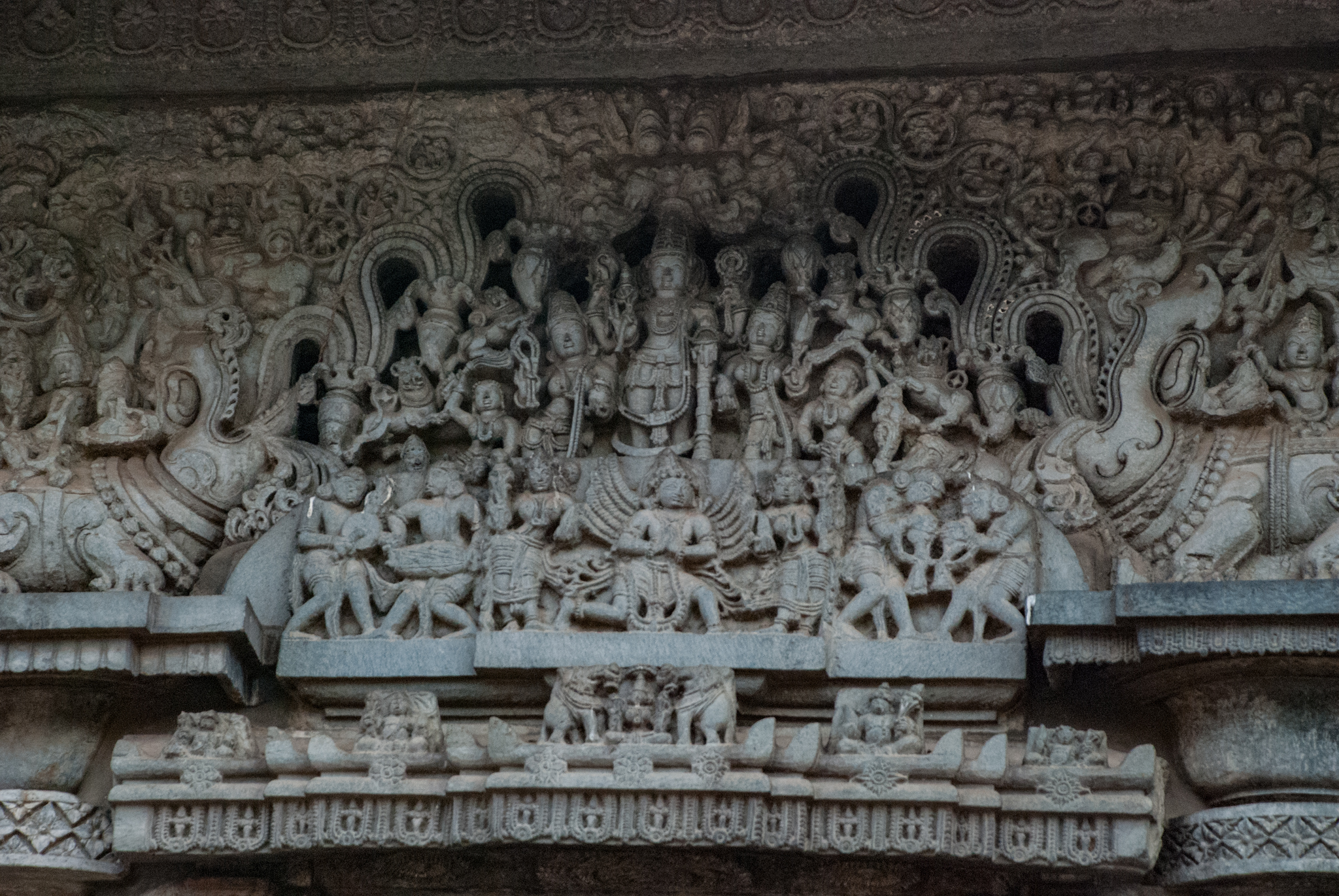
Ornated lintel with the Makara (mythical beasts) on either side

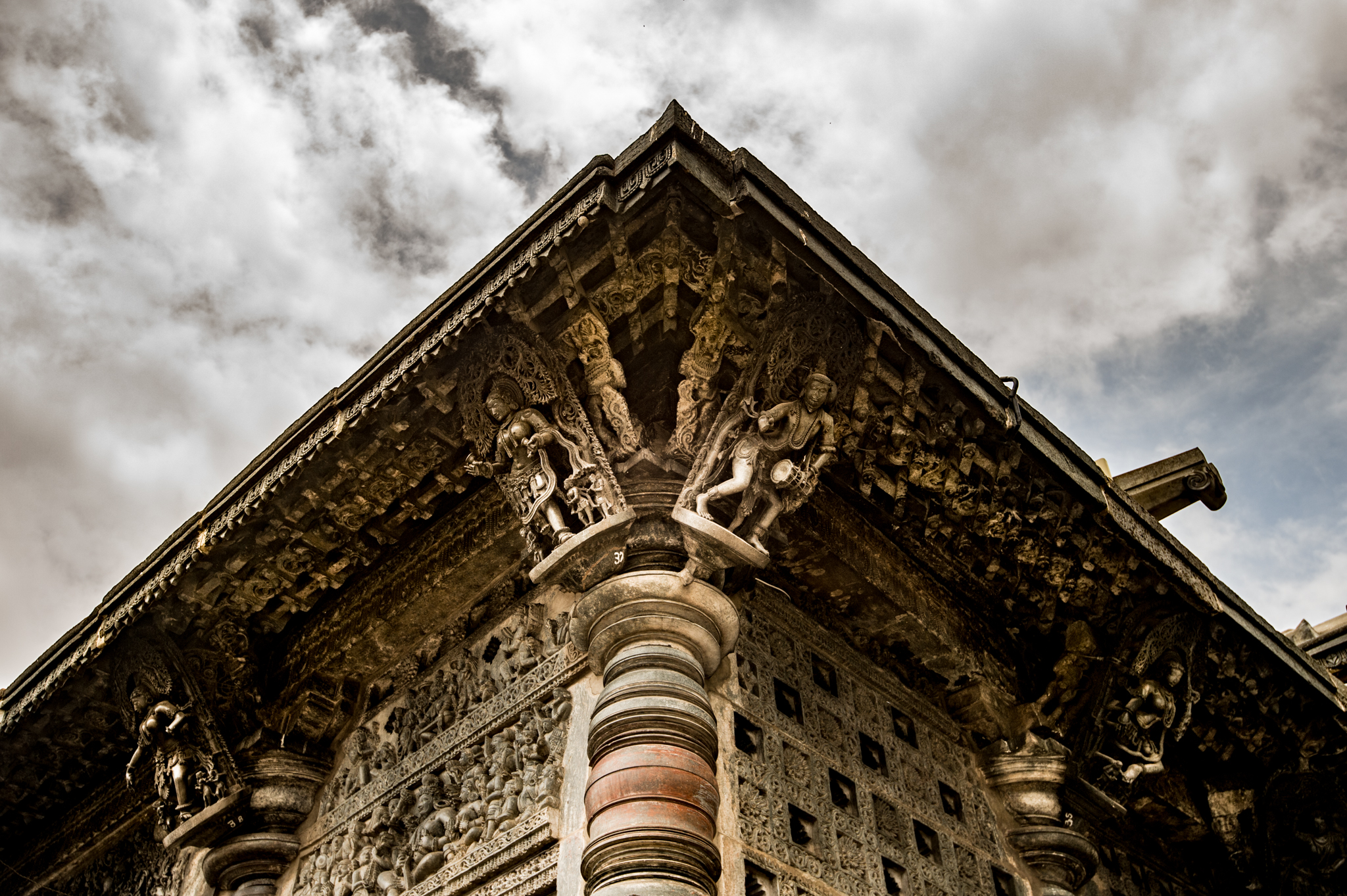
Madanikas below the eaves

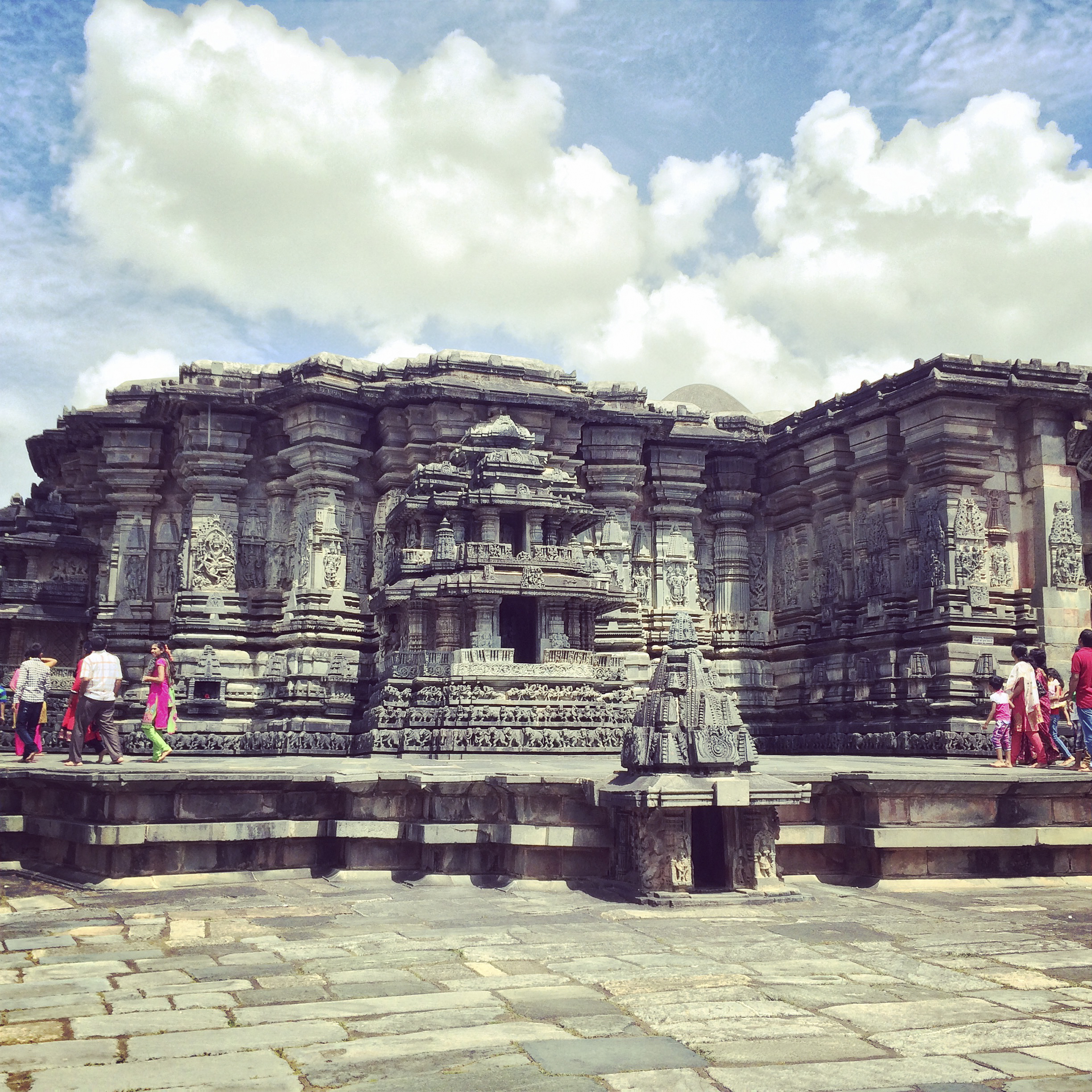
The central structure of the Chennakeshava Temple as viewed from the north-east corner of the inner court.

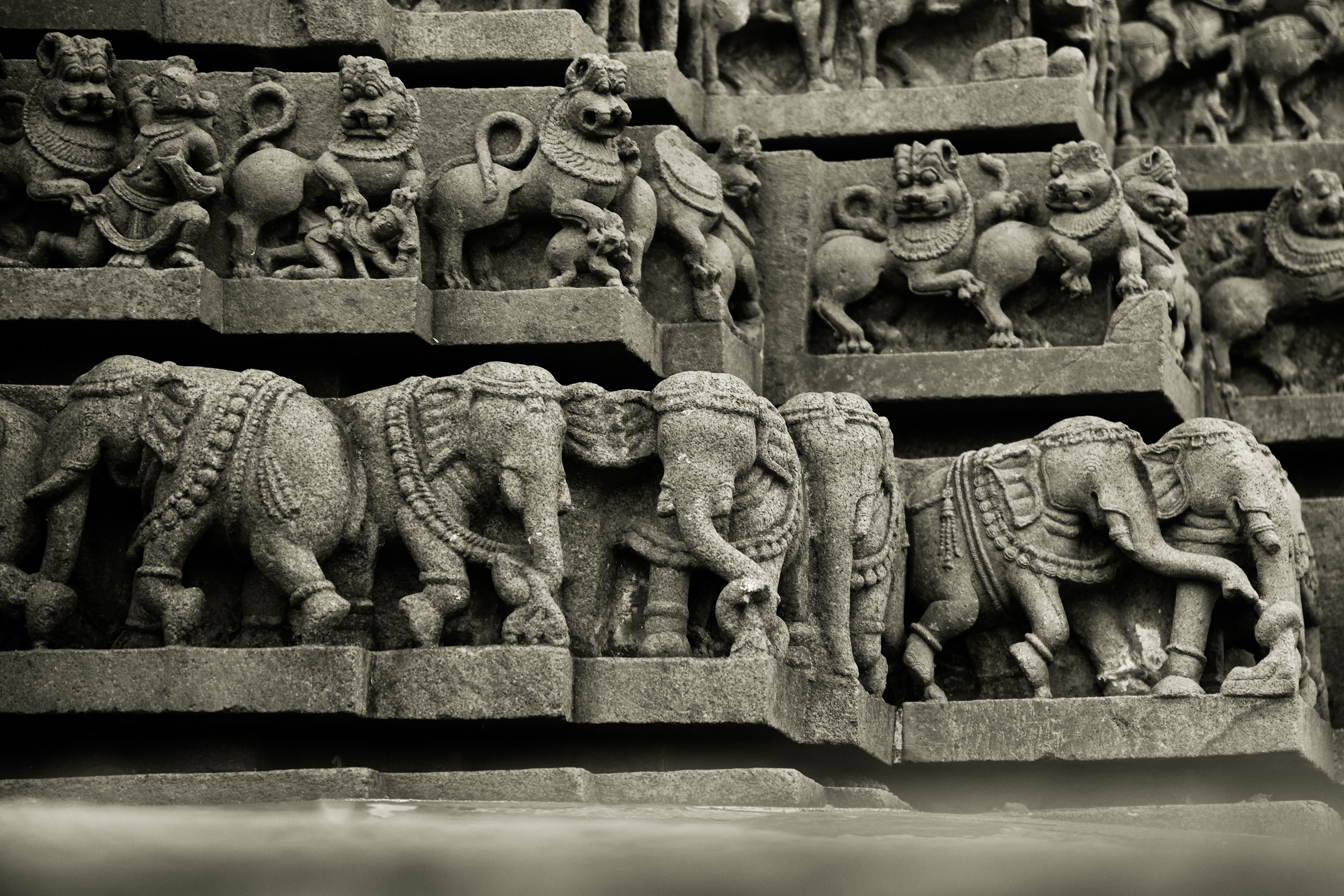
A Close up of decorative moulding frieze on outer wall of mandapa, Chennakeshava Temple, Belur, Karnataka
