= Arekalla =

Hoysala King
- Reign: 950
- Predecessor: Sala (Hoysala Dynasty)
- Successor: Maruga
- Dynasty: Hoysala

Arekalla was a local chieftain in the Malenadu region of Karnataka, dated to around (950 CE) who is considered the earliest known record of a member of the Hoysala family. He was succeeded in turn by Maruga, Nripa Kama I (who ruled around 976 CE), and Munda (Hoysala) (c. 1006–1026 CE). and Arekalla sometimes described in local traditions as a kinsman or brother of Sala (hoysala), the legendary founder of the Hoysala dynasty of Karnataka, India. Though Arekalla does not appear in major inscriptions, oral histories in parts of the Malnad region mention him alongside Sala as part of the early lineage of the Hoysala family.

Nripa Kama I bore the title Permandi, indicating an early alliance with the Western Ganga dynasty during his reign. This period marked the Hoysalas' initial rise from local chiefs to significant feudatories of the Western Chalukyas of Kalyana, laying the groundwork for their later independence and expansion under Vishnuvardhana.

== Legend and tradition ==
Traditional accounts about the origins of the Hoysalas center is Sosevuru (now Angadi village). Sosevuru (Angadi) is considered the historical heart of Jainism where most Jain present at the time. and some regional folklore, Arekalla is mentioned as Sala’s brother or close relative who assisted in consolidating their clan’s power in the Western Ghats.

These traditions claim the family emerged from the Malnad region of Karnataka, where they were originally local chiefs before rising to prominence under the Western Chalukyas.

== Historical context ==
While there is no direct inscriptional record of Arekalla himself, early Hoysalas were documented as feudatories of the Western Chalukyas of Kalyana in the 11th century. Kings such as Nripa Kama II and Vinayaditya gradually expanded their control over Gangavadi. The dynasty’s power consolidated in the 12th century under King Vishnuvardhana, who defeated the Cholas and established the Hoysalas as major rulers of the Deccan.

== Legacy ==
The legend of Sala—and occasionally of Arekalla—symbolizes the martial valor and humble beginnings of the Hoysala dynasty. Sculptural depictions of Sala’s tiger-slaying feat became the royal emblem and were widely used in Hoysala architecture, especially at Belur and Halebidu.
