= Munda (Hoysala dynasty) =

Early ruler of the Hoysala dynasty

Hoysala King
- Reign: c. 1006 – c. 1026 CE
- Predecessor: Nripa Kama I
- Successor: Nripa Kama II
- Dynasty: Hoysala

Munda was an early ruler of the Hoysala dynasty who reigned around c. (1006–1026 CE) in the Malenadu region of present-day Karnataka, India. He succeeded Nripa kama I and is listed in Hoysala genealogies as one of the dynasty’s formative chieftains before its rise to major power.

Munda ruled at a time when the Hoysalas were still feudatories of the Western Chalukyas of Kalyana. Although inscriptions from his period are scarce, his reign is seen as part of the consolidation of Hoysala control over the Malenadu region, which laid the foundation for future expansion into southern Karnataka (Gangavadi).

Munda's era represents the transitional phase in Hoysala history, bridging the smaller local chieftaincies of Arekalla, Maruga, and Nripa kama I with the more centralized and ambitious rule of Vinayaditya and Vishnuvardhana in the 11th–12th centuries.
