= Bagewadi =

Bagewadi may refer to several places in Karnataka, India:

== Belagavi district ==
- Bellad Bagewadi, a village
- Chick-Bagewadi, a village
- Giriyal Kariyat Bagewadi, a village
- Hire Bagewadi, a village
  - Hire Bagewadi Assembly constituency, 1967–2008
- Kadatanbagewadi, a village

== Bijapur district ==
- Basavana Bagewadi, a town
  - Basavana Bagevadi Assembly constituency
