= Sala (Hoysala Dynasty) =

- Hoy, Sala Founder of Hoysala Dynasty
- Reign: 950
- Successor: Maruga
- Born: Sosevuru (Angadi), Chikkamagaluru District Karnataka
- Dynasty: Hoysala Dynasty

Sala is the legendary founder of the Hoysala dynasty of Karnataka, India. He is remembered for the famous story in which he killed a tiger (or lion) on the command of his Jain preceptor, an act that is said to have given the dynasty its name.

== Legend and name ==
According to Hoysala tradition, the dynasty's name originated from the words Hoy, Sala! meaning "Strike, Sala!", shouted by his Jain guru Sudatta Muni when Sala encountered a tiger (sometimes described as a lion) threatening the sage during worship. Sala is said to have slain the beast with a single blow, establishing his bravery and giving rise to the royal emblem depicting the fight.

This legend is prominently depicted in sculpture at Hoysala temples such as the Chennakeshava Temple at Belur, where the emblem of Sala fighting the tiger/lion became the royal crest of the Hoysalas.

== Historical context ==
While Sala himself remains a semi-legendary figure, inscriptions suggest that the Hoysala family originated in the Malnad region (Western Ghats) of Karnataka. Sosevuru, now known as Angadi village in Chikkamagaluru district, is traditionally regarded as their ancestral home and was a prominent Jain religious center at the time.

The Hoysalas began as local chiefs or feudatories of the Western Chalukyas of Kalyana. Early rulers like Nripa Kama and Vinayaditya expanded their influence over Gangavadi (southern Karnataka). The dynasty rose to major power in the 12th century under King Vishnuvardhana, who defeated the Cholas and consolidated control over the Deccan.

== Legacy ==
Sala's the legend of his tiger-slaying act served as a powerful origin myth for the Hoysala dynasty. It symbolized royal valor and divine favor, legitimizing the dynasty’s rule and linking it to the protection of religious institutions.

Today, the "Hoy, Sala!" story and emblem are iconic parts of Karnataka’s cultural heritage, celebrated in art, sculpture, and folklore.
