= Rajaditya =

Rajaditya may refer to:

- Ranaditya Satya (fl. c. 480), Sindh ruler
- Rajaditya Chola (fl. mid-10th century), Chola prince
- Rajaditya (mathematician) (fl. c. 1190), Jain mathematician
