= Ereyanga =

Hoysala King from 1098 to 1102 CE

Hoysala King
- Reign: c. 1098 – c. 1102 CE
- Predecessor: Vinayaditya
- Successor: Veera Ballala I
- Spouse: Echala Devi
- Issue: Veera Ballala I; Vishnuvardhana; Udayaditya
- Dynasty: Hoysala
- Father: Vinayaditya
- Mother: Keleyala Devi
- Religion: Jainism

Ereyanga (r. 1098–1102 CE) was the son of Vinayaditya and distinguished himself as a Chalukya feudatory during their campaigns against Dhara of Malwa. Though he remained the Yuvaraja or crown prince for several decades, his rule as a monarch of Hoysala Empire was short. He was a Jain by faith and took the title 'Vira Ganga'.

== Life ==
Ereyanga was born to the Hoysala king Vinayaditya and his wife Keleyabbe or Keleyala Devi. He was appointed the Yuvaraja in 1062, and seems to have held that position for 33 years. He first distinguished himself by helping Chalukya Someshvara II in suppressing rebellions. Ereyanga is described as a right hand to Someshvara, and was an important commander in the Chalukya army. He is said to have burnt Dhara, a city of the king of Malwa, struck terror into the Cholas, laid waste to Chakragotta and broken the king of Kalinga.

Ereyanga had 3 sons through his wife Echala Devi- Ballala, Bitti Deva and Udayaditya. Ballala succeeded his grandfather Vinayaditya to the throne, but did not live long and Udayaditya died in 1123. However, Bitti Deva would go on to become one of the greatest Hoysala kings.

== Sources ==
- Dr. Suryanath U. Kamat, A Concise history of Karnataka from pre-historic times to the present, Jupiter books, MCC, Bangalore, 2001 (Reprinted 2002) OCLC: 7796041

Preceded by Vinayaditya	Hoysala; 1098–1102	Succeeded by Veera Ballala I
