= Vairagya =

Dispassion, detachment, or renunciation in Hinduism and Jainism

Vairāgya (Sanskrit: वैराग्य) is a Sanskrit term used in Jainism and Hinduism as well as Eastern philosophy that roughly translates as dispassion, detachment, or renunciation, in particular renunciation from the pains and pleasures in the temporary material world. The Hindu philosophers who advocated vairāgya told their followers that it is a means to achieve moksha.

True vairāgya refers to an internal state of mind rather than to external lifestyle and can be practiced equally well by one engaged in family life and career as it can be by a renunciate. Vairāgya does not mean suppression of or developing repulsion for material objects. By the application of vivek (spiritual discrimination or discernment) to life experience, the aspirant gradually develops a strong attraction for the inner spiritual source of fulfillment and happiness and limited attachments fall away naturally. Balance is maintained between the inner spiritual state and one's external life through the practice of seeing all limited entities as expressions of the one Cosmic Consciousness.

== Etymology ==
Vairāgya is an abstract noun derived from the word virāga (joining vi meaning "without" + rāga meaning "passion, feeling, emotion, interest"). This gives vairāgya a general meaning of "ascetic disinterest" in things that would cause attachment in most people. It is a "dis-passionate" stance on life. An ascetic who has subdued all passions and desires is called a vairāgika. Further etymological definition indicates the root rańj, referring to colour: Vi – rańj + ghaiṋ = virága. The state of virága is vairágya. Virága means "to go beyond colour" or "to be uncoloured". To remain completely engaged in the world yet uncoloured by the world is called vairágya.

A practitioner of vairagya is called a vairagi.

== Jainism ==
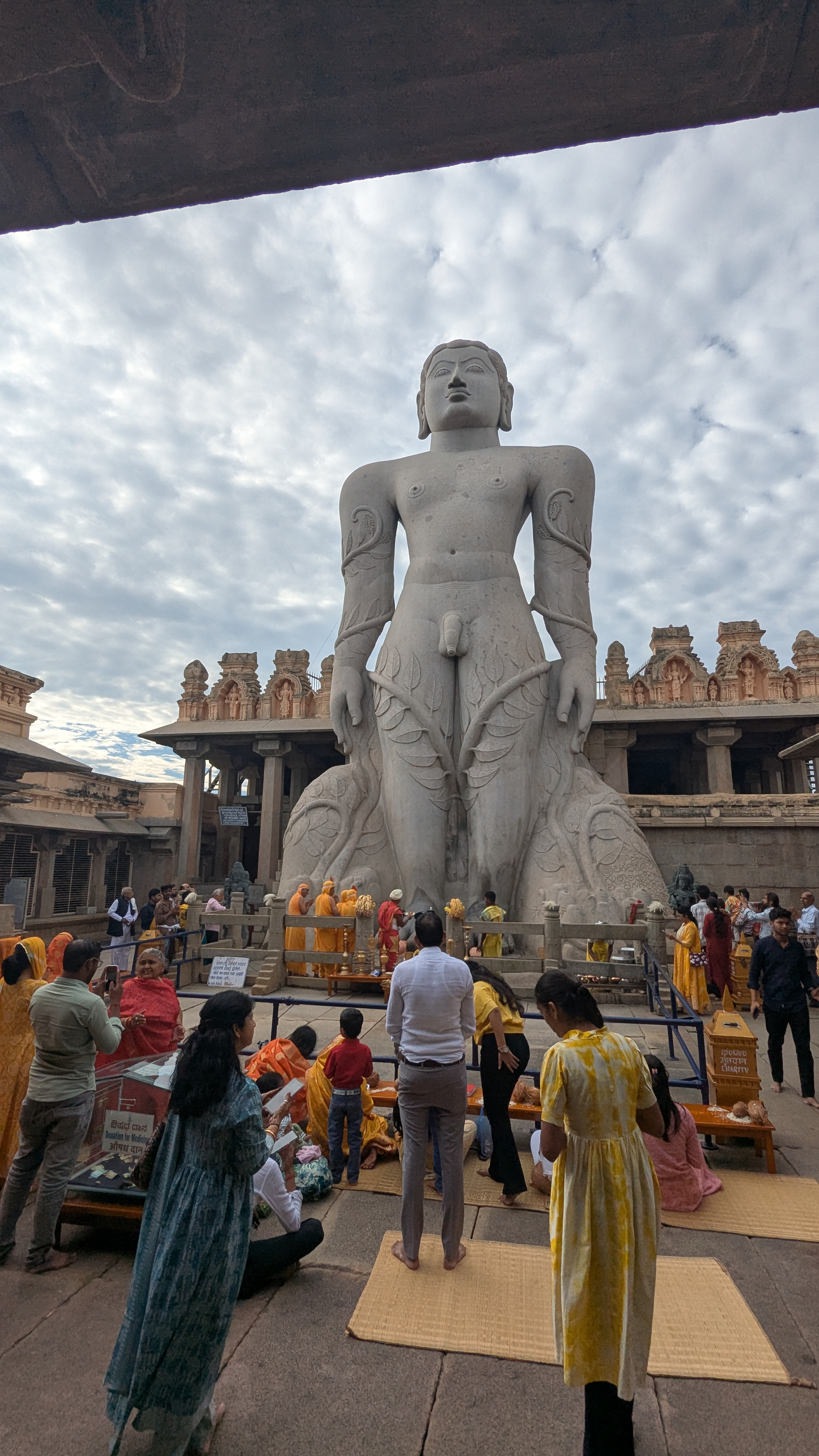
Bahubali, regarded in Jainism as an exemplar of Vairagya (renunciation and detachment).

Vairāgya (वैराग्य, "detachment") according to the 2nd-century Tattvārthasūtra 7.12.—What is meant by detachment (vairāgya)? To develop disinterest towards the subjects of the sensual and physical pleasures is detachment. It can also be defined as aversion leading to renunciation, or non-attachment to sensual pleasures. In Jainism, vairāgya (detachment or dispassion) denotes a profound state of non-attachment towards material possessions, relationships, and sensory pleasures, regarded as a crucial step towards liberation (moksha). It involves the voluntary renunciation of worldly ties and desires, replacing them with equanimity and spiritual focus. The concept is deeply embedded in Jain ethics and is cultivated through meditation, austerities (tapas), and adherence to the five major vows (mahāvratas). Scriptures such as the Tattvārtha Sūtra and philosophical treatises by acharyas like Kundakunda in Samayasara highlight vairāgya as a prerequisite for the higher stages of spiritual development, ultimately leading to omniscience (kevala jñāna), about Vairagya Explained very well in Many Jains texts including Ācārāṅga Sūtra, Sutrakritanga, Pravacanasāra, Upadeśamālā, Ādipurāṇa, Trishashtishalākāpuruṣacharitra, Harivamsa Purana.

The life of Bahubali is often cited as an ideal example of vairāgya. After defeating his brother Bharata in a duel for the kingdom, Bahubali experienced intense detachment from worldly glory and voluntarily renounced his sovereignty, wealth, and family life to become a monk. Standing in deep meditation (kāyotsarga) for a year without moving, even as vines grew around his body, he attained kevala jñāna through the complete abandonment of pride and attachment.

Historical records also mention numerous Jain rulers who embraced vairāgya and abdicated their thrones to adopt an ascetic life. The Rashtrakuta king Amoghavarsha, who believed to became a Jain monk under his guru Acharya Jinasena, renounced royal pleasures and ruled with detachment and religious tolerance. Kharavela of Kalinga, Kumarapala of the Chaulukyas, Ganggaraj of the Hoysala kingdom., and Shivamara II of the Ganga dynasty and the last rashtrakuta king Indra IV who renounced royal life and became Jain monk are among the many kings noted for relinquishing worldly life in keeping with Jain ideals. Jain tradition holds that almost all devout Jain kings eventually renounced power to become monks, following the example of the 24 tīrthaṅkaras, all of whom were born into royal families but renounced their kingdoms in pursuit of spiritual liberation.

== Hinduism ==
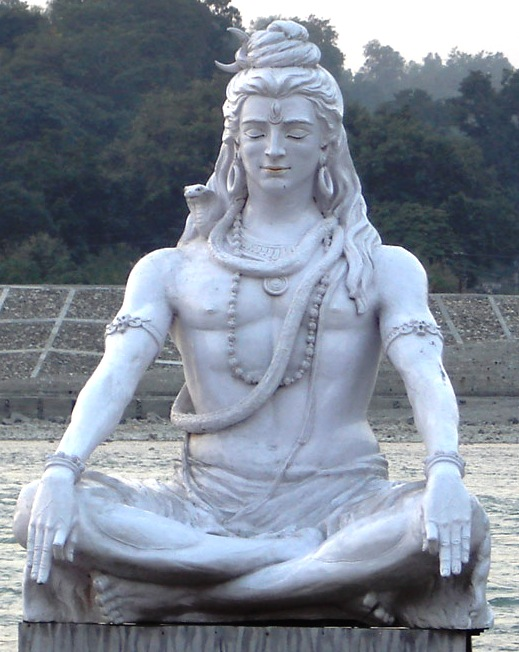
Shiva is manifestation of state of Vairagya

The concept of Vairāgya is found in the Yoga Sūtras of Patañjali, where it, along with practice (abhyāsa), is the key to restraint of the modifications of the mind (YS 1.12, "abhyāsa-vairāgyabhyāṁ tannirodhaḥ"). The term vairāgya appears three times in the Bhagavad Gita (6.35, 13.8, 18.52) where it is recommended as a key means for bringing control to the restless mind. It is also the main topic of Mokṣopāya or Yoga-Vāsiṣṭha. The mind runs to places it has been habituated to run to the past; without attachment we are freed from this point of view of a wandering mind. Non-attachment means dispassion towards the world. The supreme goal of enlightenment is one that requires self-sacrifice. It is a difficult task, and the state is very difficult to attain, with death being the final test: This suggests detachment. The bodhisattva is one who restrains the senses, sacrificing both attraction and aversion, abandoning the sounds and sights of the sense organs that would cause attachment. Krishna tells Arjuna that acting with detachment means doing the right thing for its own sake, because it needs to be done, without worrying about success or failure. Krishna says to Arjuna not to give up on doing his best; his destiny is his continued good performance of his role. The detachment is in not being impassioned by the feelings associated in living with continued awareness of success and failure, because both are irrelevant. He must accept happiness and distress, loss and gain, victory and success in equal measure. Detachment may mean treating these agitating, distressing or perturbing dichotomies in an equal sense. Arjuna must do his duty without apprehension and loss by having no attachment to the fruits of his actions. He is told that if he fights with equanimity, treating all outcomes as the same, he will not accumulate bad karma. If one surrenders their selfish motives and works merely to fulfill their duty towards the Supreme, they will be alleviated of any karmic reactions.

Another important text on renunciation is Vairāgya śataka or "100 verses of Renunciation", a part of the Śatakatraya collection by Bhartṛhari.

== See also ==
- Nekkhamma, closely related concept in Buddhism
- Upekṣā, closely related concept in Buddhism
- Tyāga
- Samatva
- Epoché
- Equanimity

== Sources ==
- Jaina, Jyotiprasāda (1951). Jainism: the Oldest Living Religion. 2nd ed. Jain Cultural Research Society. Available on Google Books
- Nagarajaiah, Hampa (1999). Jainism in Southern Karnataka. Bangalore: Sapna Book House. OCLC 45166444.
