= Hire Bagewadi =

- Village
- Location in Karnataka, India Hire Bagewadi (India)
- Coordinates: 15.774428°N 74.644154°E
- Country: India
- State: Karnataka
- District: Belgaum
- Talukas: Belagavi

Population (2011)
  - Total: 12,684

Languages
  - Official: Kannada
- Time zone: UTC+5:30 (IST)

Hire Bagewadi is a village in the southern state of Karnataka, India. It is located in the Belagavi Taluk of Belagavi district in Karnataka.

== Demographics ==
As of 2011 India census, Hire Bagewadi had a population of 12684 with 6411 males and 6273 females.

== See also ==
- Chick-Bagewadi
- Belgaum
- Districts of Karnataka
