= Rajaditya (mathematician) =

Jain mathematician

Rajaditya (fl. c. 1190 CE) was a Jain mathematician, scholar, and poet. In the court of Hoysala king Vishnuvardhana he was known as the earliest author of mathematical works in Kannada. He is remembered for his contributions to medieval Indian mathematics and literature in Karnataka.

== Early life and background ==
He described himself as a devotee of Neminatha Tirthankara and was a native of "Puvina Bage" in North Karnataka (today's Raybag, Belagavi district), thought to be near modern Hoovinahadagali or Bagewadi.

He was known for his poetic talent and scholarly ability, likely serving in a royal court. His patrons included "Bahubali" and "Bharatha". He described his father as Shripathi, his mother as Vasantha, and his guru as Shubhachandra Siddhanta deva.

Rajaditya was conferred several honorific titles for his mastery, including Ganita Vilasa, Ojevedanga, Padyavidyadhara, Uttamabhavyabhushana, and Jinapadakamalamadhukara.

== Works ==
Rajaditya is credited with authoring several mathematical and poetic works in Kannada. These include Vyavahāragaṇita, Kṣetragaṇita, Jainagaṇita Sūtrodāharaṇa, Vyavahāraratna and Līlāvati, and Chitrahasuge.

He is considered the first known author of mathematical treatises in Kannada. Vyavahāragaṇita is the only one fully preserved and was published in 1955 by the Government of Madras, edited by M. Mariappa Bhat.
