= Hoysala Kingdom =

Medieval Kingdom in South India

Hoysala kingdom
- 950–1346
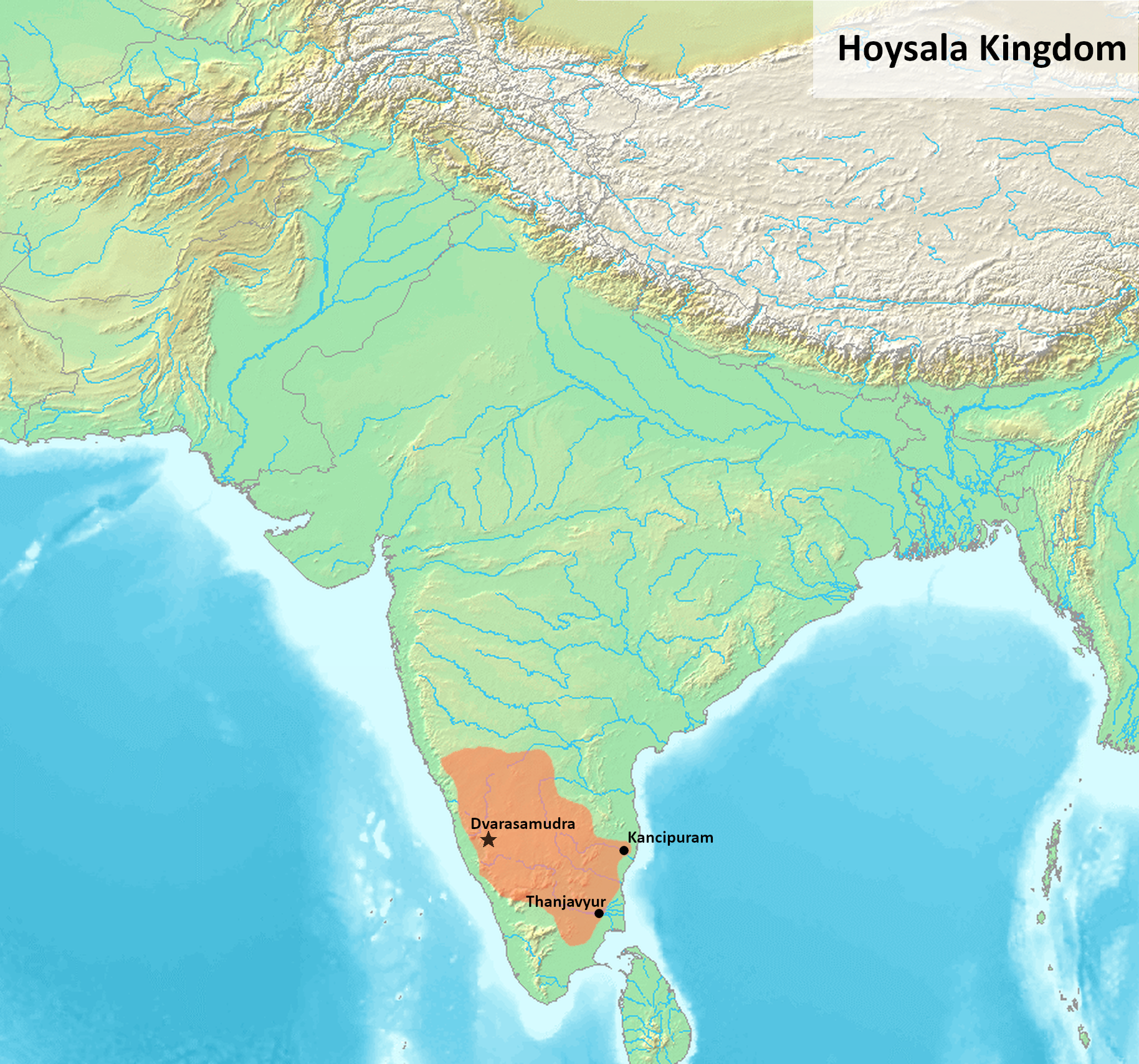
- Greatest extent of the Hoysala kingdom, c. 1050–1355
- Capital: Sosevur(Angadi) (1026–1048); Belur (1048–1062); Halebidu (1062–1300); Tiruvannamalai (1300–1343)
- Common languages: Kannada; Sanskrit
- Religion: Jainism; Hinduism
- Government: Monarchy
- King
  - 950–960: Arekalla
  - 1343–1346: Veera Ballala IV
- History
  - Established: 950
  - Disestablished: 1346
Preceded by	Succeeded by
Western Chalukya Empire	Vijayanagara Empire

The Hoysala Kingdom was a prominent South Indian dynasty that ruled most of what is now Karnataka, as well as parts of Tamil Nadu and southwestern Telangana, between the 11th and 14th centuries CE. The capital was initially located at Belur and was later moved to Halebidu.

The origins of the Hoysala dynasty are traced to the Malnad region of Karnataka. Initially, the Hoysalas served as feudatories of the Western Chalukyas of Kalyana. The dynasty gained prominence under King Vishnuvardhana particularly after the defeat of the Cholas in the Battle of Talakad, which consolidated Hoysala authority in the Deccan. Taking advantage of the conflict between the Western Chalukyas and the Kalachuris of Kalyani in the 12th century, the Hoysalas expanded their domain, eventually controlling large parts of Karnataka, and parts of northwestern Tamil Nadu and western Andhra Pradesh (now Telangana).

The Hoysala period was a significant era for the development of South Indian art, architecture, and literature. Over 100 temples from this period survive, showcasing intricate Hoysala architecture. Well-known temples which exhibit what the historian Sailendra Sen has called "an amazing display of sculptural exuberance" include the Chennakeshava Temple in Belur, the Hoysaleswara Temple in Halebidu, and the Chennakesava Temple in Somanathapura. These three temples were inscribed as UNESCO World Heritage Sites in 2023. The Hoysala rulers also patronised the fine arts encouraging the literature to flourish in Kannada and Sanskrit with notable contributions made by Jain and Brahmin poets.

== History ==
=== Origin of the clan ===
Early inscriptions, dated 1078 and 1090, have implied that the Hoysalas were descendants of the Yadu by referring to the Yadava vamsha (or clan) as the "Hoysala vamsha". But there are no early records directly linking the Hoysalas to the Yadavas of North India.

=== Legendary beginnings ===
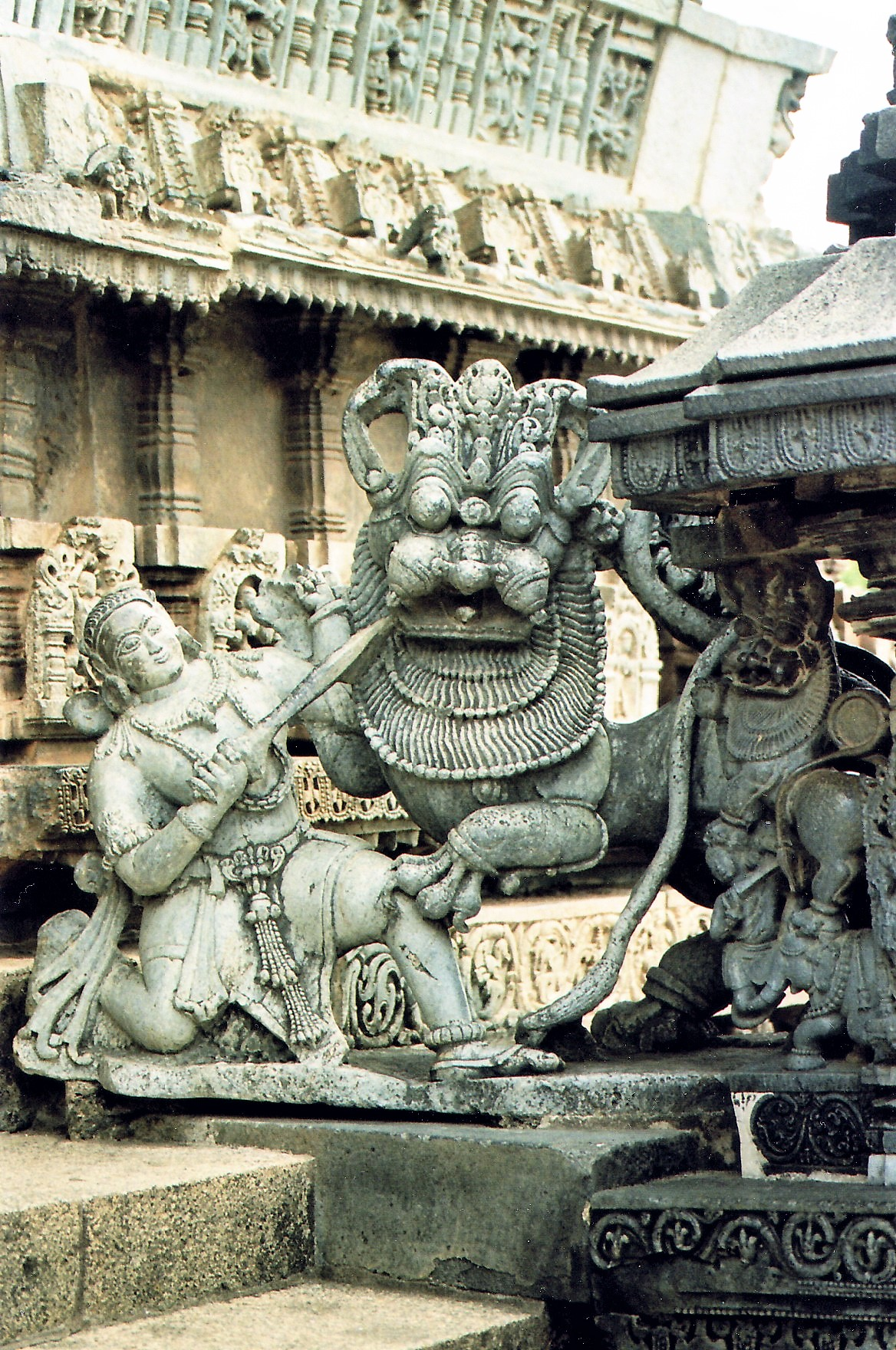
Sala fighting a tiger, the emblem of the Hoysala Empire, at the Chennakeshava Temple, Belur

Kannada folklore tells a legend of a young man, Sala (also known as Poysala), who saved his Jain guru Sudatta by killing a tiger (sometimes described as a lion) that they encountered whilst in a forest, at "Sosevur" located at present-day Angadi Village in Chikkamagaluru district, the original home of the Hoysala family. The word strike translates to "hoy" in Old Kannada, hence the name 'Hoy-sala'. The legend purporting to show how Sala became the founder of the Hoysala dynasty is shown in the Belur inscription of the Hoysala king Vishnuvardhana, dated c. 1117, but owing to several inconsistencies in the story it remains in the realm of folklore. Their inscriptions refer to the founders of the Hoysala dynasty as Maleparolganda ('Lord of the hills'), which makes their original home the Malenadu region of modern southern Karnataka. Vishnuvardhana achieved a victory over the Cholas at Talakadu in 1116, and the legend may have arisen or gained popularity after this event, as the Hoysala emblem depicts Sala fighting a tiger, the tiger being the emblem of the Cholas.

=== Establishment of the Kingdom ===
The earliest record of the Hoysala family dates to about c. 950 CE, naming Arekalla as a local chieftain. He was succeeded by Maruga, Nripa Kama I (c. 976 CE), and Munda (1006–1026 CE). Nripa Kama I is described with the title Permanadi indicating an early alliance with the Western Ganga dynasty. The Hoysalas emerged from the Malnad region in the Western Ghats as feudatories of the Western Chalukyas of Kalyani, gradually expanding their territory during the conflict between the Chalukyas and the Cholas and eventually gaining independence as the Chalukya power declined.

=== Wars with the Cholas and Chalukyas ===
During the reign of King Vishnuvardhana (r. c. 1108–1152 CE), the Hoysalas fought decisive campaigns against the Cholas. Chola incursions into Gangavadi reportedly included the destruction of Jain Basadis around Talakadu. Vishnuvardhana's general Ganggaraj led the counter-offensive defeating the Chola general Adiyamma near Talakadu and recovering lost territory. After this victory Vishnuvardhana earned the title "Talakadugonda" ("Conqueror of Talakadu"), while inscriptions highlighted Gangaraja's leading role in these campaigns.

King Vishnuvardhana fought the Western (Kalyani) Chalukyas in Nolambavadi asserting his independence from them. In a second Chola campaign, the Hoysala armies chased the Chola forces to Vellore which was deep inside Tamil territory. For these victories, Vishnuvardhana made significant land grants to his general at Kambadahalli which would become an important center for Jainism. These campaigns weakened Chola influence and consolidated Hoysala power in the Deccan, and historians credit the successes of King Vishnuvardhana as pivotal in establishing Hoysala independence and the military leadership of his general Gangaraj as a major factor in these victories.

Vishnuvardhana's grandson Veera Ballala II further strengthened the kingdom and expanded its influence. He declared war against the Yadavas and defeated the Kadambas. He declared independence in 1193. During the establishment of the Hoysala Kingdom, the Deccan Plateau saw a four-way struggle for hegemony between four dynasties: the Hoysalas, the Pandyans, the Kakatiyas, and the Seunas. In 1217, Veera Ballala II defeated the aggressive Pandya after they invaded the Chola Kingdom, helped to restore the Chola king on his throne and assumed the title Dakshina Chakravarthi ("Emperor of the south").

=== Increased influence and later eclipse ===
The Hoysalas extended their foothold in modern-day Tamil Nadu around 1225, making the city of Kannanur Kuppam near Srirangam a provincial capital and taking control over the southern Deccan region. Vira Narasimha II's son Vira Someshwara earned the honorific Mamadi (uncle) from the Pandyas and Cholas. From 1220 to 1245 the dynasty's hegemony increased southwards to cover both the Chola and Pandya Kingdoms. Toward the end of the 13th century, Veera Ballala III recaptured territory in the Tamil country which had been lost during a Pandya uprising, thus uniting the northern and southern portions of the Kingdom.

In the early part of the 14th century, major political changes took place in the Deccan region during a period when large areas of northern India were under Muslim rule. Alauddin Khalji, the Sultan of Delhi, was determined to control southern India. In 1311 he sent his commander Malik Kafur on an expedition to plunder Devagiri, the capital city of the Seuna Kingdom By 1318 the Seuna Kingdom had been subjugated. The Hoysala capital Halebidu was besieged and sacked twice, in 1311 and 1327. By 1336, the Sultan had conquered the Pandyas of Madurai, the Kakatiyas of Warangal and the tiny Kingdom of Kampili. The Hoysalas were the only remaining Hindu Kingdom who resisted the invading armies. Veera Ballala III stationed himself at Tiruvannamalai and offered stiff resistance to invasions from the north and the Madurai Sultanate to the south. Then, after nearly three decades of resistance, Veera Ballala III was killed at the battle of Madurai in 1343, and the sovereign territories of the Hoysala Kingdom were merged with the areas administered by Harihara I in the Tungabhadra River region. This new Hindu Kingdom resisted the northern invasions and would later prosper and come to be known as the Vijayanagara Empire.

== Economy ==
Location of the Hoysala Empire and main contemporary South Asian polities in 1175, on the eve of the Ghurid Empire invasion of the subcontinent.

The empire consisted of the valleys of three main rivers, the Krishna, the Tungabhadra, and the Kaveri, whose systems facilitated the growth of crops and generated an agricultural output that was immense. The highlands (malnad regions) with its temperate climate was suitable for raising cattle and the planting of orchards and spices. Paddy and millets were staple crops in the tropical plains (Bailnad). As agricultural land was scarce, forests, waste land and previously unfarmed land was reclaimed, and new settlements were established. Large areas of forest were cleared to bring lands under cultivation and build villages. The Hoysala kings gave grants of land as rewards for service to the heads of families, who then became landlords (gavunda) to tenants who worked on the land and in the forests. The praja gavunda ("the gavunda of the people") had a lower status than the wealthier prabhu gavunda ("of the lord")

The Hoysala administration supported itself through revenues from an agrarian economy. Land was assessed as being wet land, dry land or garden land for the purposes of taxation, and judged according to the quality of the soil. Taxes on commodities (gold, precious stones, perfumes, sandalwood, ropes, yarn, housing, hearths, shops, cattle pans, sugarcane presses) as well as produce (black pepper, betel leaves, ghee, paddy, spices, palm leaves, coconuts, sugar) are noted in village records. The Hoysalas encouraged people to move to newly-built villages by means of land grants and tax concessions.

Taxes, collected in the form of cash, from trade and commerce generated considerable wealth for the Hoysala state, and enabled it to buy armaments, elephants, horses and precious goods. The state and the merchant class became interdependent, with some more prosperous merchants being known as Rajasresthigal (royal merchants), officially recognised on account of their wealth. They were seen as puramulasthamba ('the pillars of the towns'). The increased prosperity and prestige of some merchants encouraged them to open markets and weekly fairs, with some becoming Pattanaswami (town administrators), who had the authority to collect tolls on goods that entered the town. Merchants engaged in minting activities, sometimes producing the coins and supplying them to the state.

Tanks (large reservoirs) were created at the expense of the state. The Hoysalas put resources into repairing breached tanks and broken sluices, easily damaged by heavy rainfall. They collected taxes on irrigation systems, canals and wells, all of which were built and maintained at the expense of local villagers. Repairs were undertaken by the landlords as well as their workers; such repairs were considered to be a duty and a pious act.

Importing horses for use as general transportation and in army cavalries of Indian Kingdoms was a flourishing business on the western seaboard. Song dynasty records from China mention the presence of Indian merchants in ports of South China, indicating active trade with overseas Kingdoms. South India exported textiles, spices, medicinal plants, precious stones, pottery, salt made from salt pans, jewels, gold, ivory, rhino horn, ebony, aloe wood, perfumes, sandalwood, camphor and condiments to China, Dhofar, Aden, and Siraf (the port of entry to Egypt, Arabia, and Persia).

== Administration ==
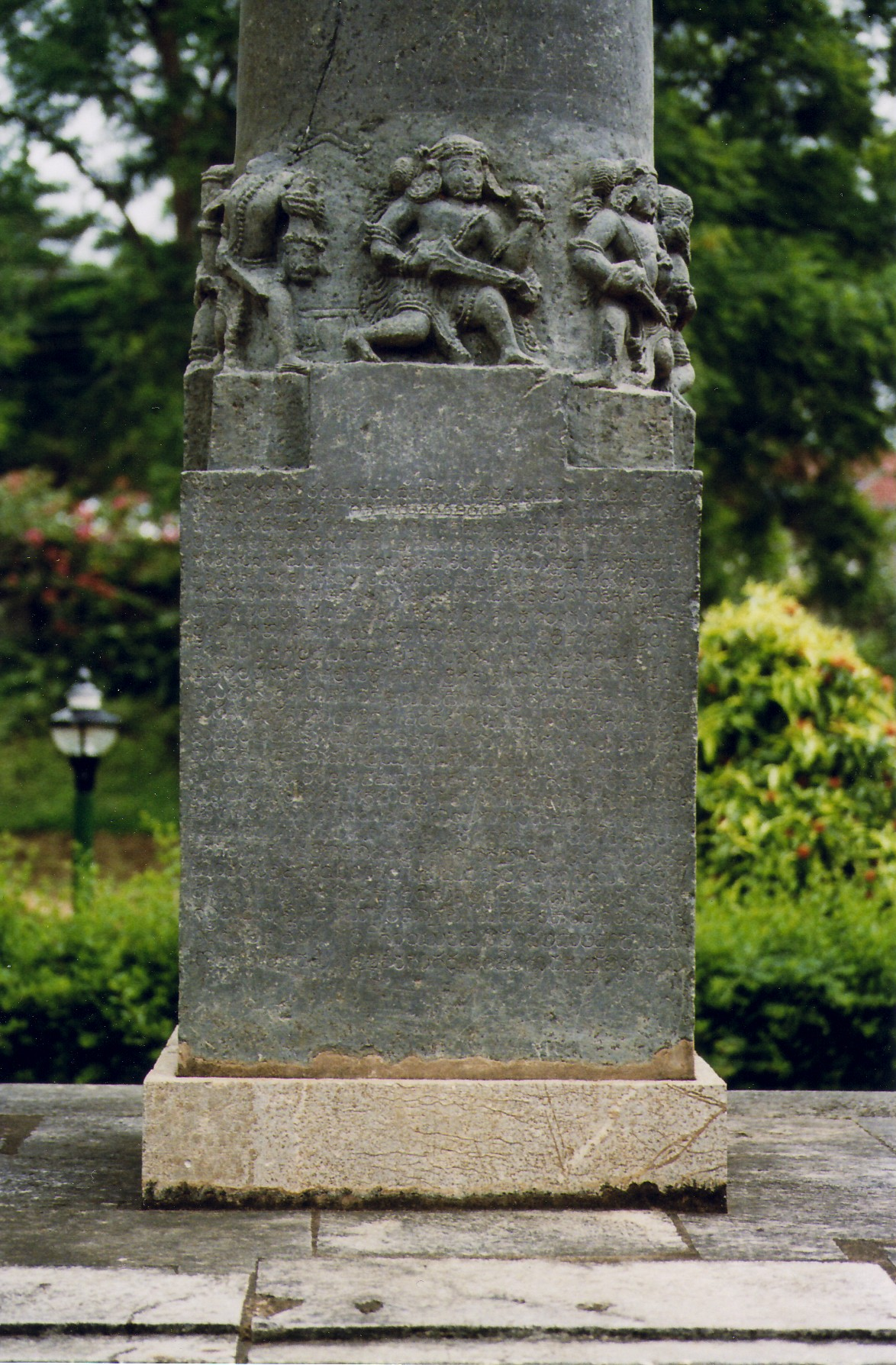
Garuda pillar hero stone (virgal) at Halebidu with old Kannada inscription of about 1220 CE.

In its administrative practices, the Hoysala Empire followed some of the well-established and proven methods of its predecessors covering administrative functions such as cabinet organisation and command, the structure of local governing bodies and the division of territory. Several of their major feudatories were Gavundas of the peasant extraction. Records show the names of many high-ranking positions reporting directly to the king. Senior ministers were called Pancha Pradhanas, ministers responsible for foreign affairs were designated Sandhivigrahi and the chief treasurer was Mahabhandari or Hiranyabhandari. Dandanayakas were in charge of armies and the chief justice of the Hoysala court was the Dharmadhikari.

The Kingdom was divided into provinces named Nadu, Vishaya, Kampana and Desha, listed in descending order of geographical size. Each province had a local governing body consisting of a minister (Mahapradhana) and a treasurer (Bhandari) that reported to the ruler of that province (Dandanayaka). Under this local ruler were officials called Heggaddes and Gavundas who hired and supervised the local farmers and labourers recruited to till the land. Subordinate ruling clans such as Alupas continued to govern their respective territories while following the policies set by the empire.

An elite and well-trained force of bodyguards known as Garudas protected the members of the royal family at all times. These servants moved closely yet inconspicuously by the side of their master, their loyalty being so complete that they committed suicide after his death. Hero stones (virgal) erected in memory of these bodyguards are called Garuda pillars. The Garuda pillar at the Hoysaleswara temple in Halebidu was erected in honor of Kuvara Lakshma, a minister and bodyguard of King Veera Ballala II.

King Vishnuvardhana's coins had the legends "victor at Nolambavadi" (Nolambavadigonda), "victor at Talakad" (Talakadugonda), "chief of the Malepas" (Maleparolganda), "Brave of Malepa" (malapavira) in Hoysala style Kannada script. Their gold coin was called Honnu or Gadyana and weighed 62 grains of gold. Pana or Hana was a tenth of the Honnu, Haga was a fourth of the Pana and Visa was fourth of Haga. There were other coins called Bele and Kani.

=== Capitals ===
The earliest Hoysala capital was at Sosevur (also called Sasakapura or Sosavurpattana), located at present-day Angadi in Chikkamagaluru district. At the time, it was a prominent Jain religious centre and is traditionally regarded as the original home of the Hoysala family. Sosevur served as the capital from around 1026 to 1048 CE. Even after the capital was moved to Belur, Sosevur remained an important commercial, administrative, and Jain religious centre. In 1048, the Hoysala capital was moved to Belur. Several factors made Belur an attractive site as a capital: first, its location on the Yagachi River provided a good supply of water year-round. Second, its location in hilly terrain made it easily defended. Third, it lay on an important trade route, helping both commerce and communications. However, Belur was barely capital for a decade before it was moved again.

The third and longest-lasting Hoysala capital was Dwarasamudra (also called Dorasamudra or Dvaravatipur), at the present-day site of Halebid. It became capital in 1062 and remained capital until the dynasty's end. The reason for the shift is unknown, but it may have been for administrative convenience. Canals were dug connecting Dwarasamudra with Belur and bringing water from the Yagachi to Dwarasamudra. Two trade routes passed through the city, and scores of temples were built in it. The city declined in the 14th century.

== Culture ==
=== Religion ===
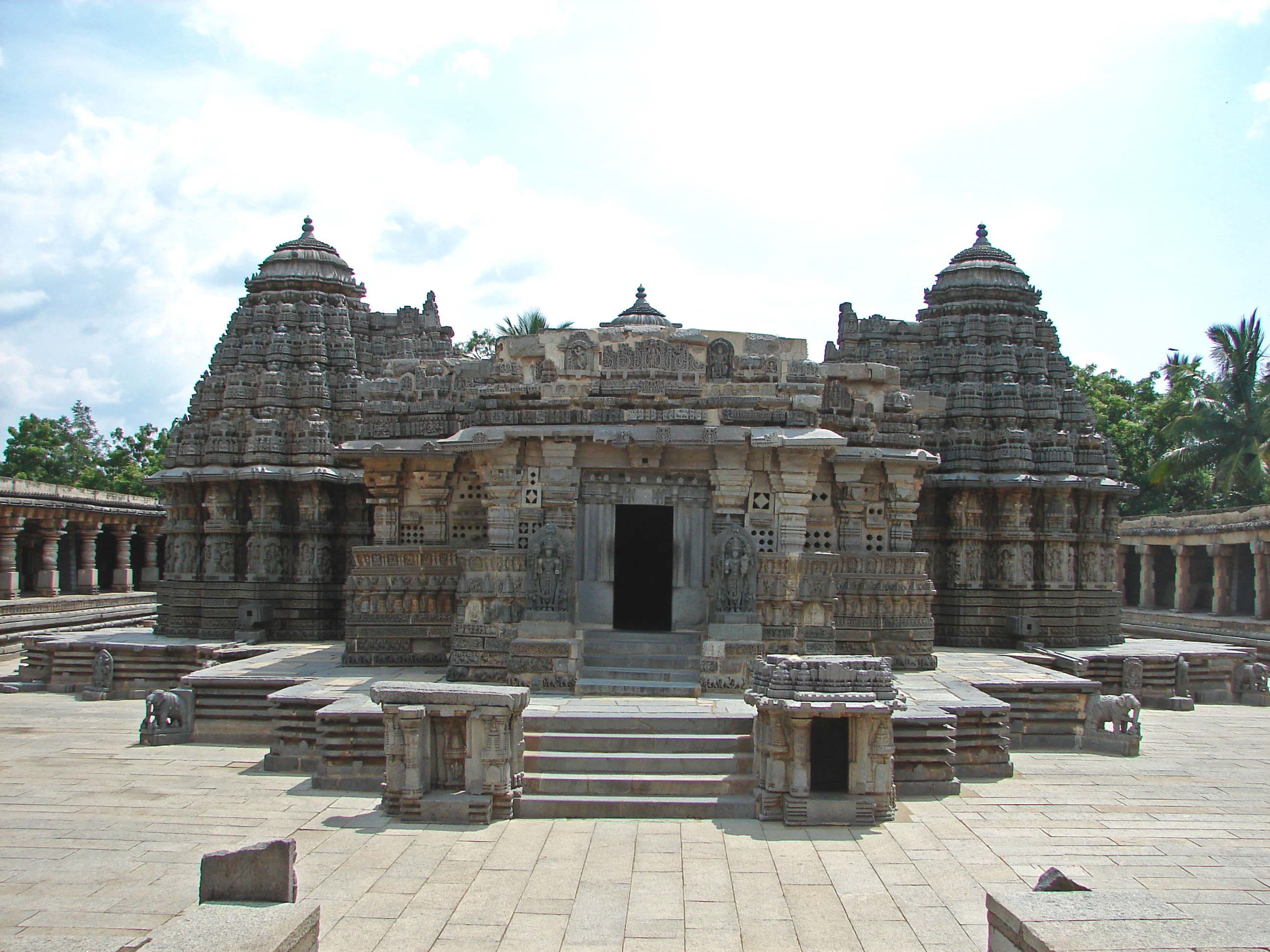
Chennakesava Temple, Somanathapura, built 1268 CE.

The Hoysala rulers were originally patrons of Jainism. In the early period of the dynasty, Hoysala kings and ministers supported Jain institutions, temples, and scholars. King Vishnuvardhana began his reign as a Jain when he was known as Bitti Deva and continued to patronize Jain institutions before his conversion. He granted lands to his general Ganggaraj who supported Jain temples at Shravanabelagola and Kambadahalli thus expanding Jain religious infrastructure in the region.

Vishnuvardhana later converted to Vaishnavism under the influence of the philosopher Ramanujacharya. His queen Shantala Devi and his Family however remained Devotees of Jainism. She spent her later years at Shravanabelagola and, after the death of her son, took the Jain vow of "Sallekhana" (Jain ritual fasting to death) at Shivagange in 1131 CE. An inscription from 1131 CE at Chandragiri Hill in Shravanabelagola records her death through "Sallekhana" in the presence of her guru Prabhachandra Siddhanta Deva, King Vishnuvardhana and her mother Machikabbe. This inscription praises her piety, details her family lineage, and mentions grants made to Jain temples. Ganggaraj is also recorded as having retired to Shravanabelagola after his military career, continuing his patronage of Jain institutions.

Several prominent Jain, Brahmin and Shaiva poets and scholars flourished under the Hoysalas, and important Jain and Hindu monuments were built during this era including shrines and other structures at Shravanabelagola.

Later Hoysala rulers increasingly supported Vaishnavism. Kings such as Narasimha I and Veera Ballala II are known for their patronage of major Hindu temples and monasteries. However, successors continued the family legacy of patronising Jainism. Inscriptions suggest that king Narasimha III worshiped Parshvanatha, the 23rd Jain Tirthankara, and his spiritual advisor was Meghanandi Siddhanta, (a Digambar Jain monk). However, with the decline of the Hoysala Kingdom Jains influence began to steadily decline in the modern Karnataka region.

=== Society ===
Hoysala society was marked by a highly stratified social order, religious pluralism, and rich cultural development. The empire was predominantly agrarian, with villages serving as the basic unit of administration and economy. Land grants to temples, monasteries, and scholars were common, helping sustain religious institutions and local elites.

Urban centers such as Halebidu, Shravanbelgola, Belur, and Somanathapura became important hubs of trade, craft production, and temple-building activity. The Hoysalas supported merchant guilds (nagaram), artisans, and sculptors, contributing to the development of the distinctive Hoysala architectural style known for its intricate ornamentation. Caste divisions were significant, with Brahmins receiving patronage for education and ritual services, while other occupational groups included agriculturists, artisans, merchants, and laborers. Inscriptions reveal a degree of social mobility through state service, military merit, and religious endowments. Religiously, society was diverse, with Jainism, Shaivism, Vaishnavism, and local traditions coexisting. Hoysala rulers were notable patrons of Jainism, granting lands and building basadis at Shravanabelagola, Halebidu, and elsewhere throughout their domains. Later kings, particularly after Vishnuvardhana's conversion under Ramanujacharya's influence, also supported Vaishnavism, leading to the construction of temples such as Chennakeshava at Belur and Hoysaleswara at Halebidu.

Society during this period became increasingly sophisticated. The status of women was varied. Some royal women were involved in administration, as shown in records describing Queen Umadevi's management of Halebidu during Veera Ballala II's military campaigns. She is also credited with suppressing rebellious feudatories. Women also participated in the fine arts, with Queen Shantala Devi renowned for her skill in dance and music. Shantala Devi remained a devout Jain and is said to have performed the Jain rite of Sallekhana at Shivagange. This pluralistic, temple-centered society encouraged art, literature, and learning, leaving behind a legacy of sculpture, inscriptions, and Kannada literary works that flourished under royal patronage. After the 12th century, Vachana Sahitya poets and Lingayat mystics such as Akka Mahadevi also contributed to the bhakti movement. Temple dancers (Devadasis) were common, often well-educated and accomplished in the arts, which gave them comparatively more freedom than other women. However, social norms remained hierarchical, with the caste system conspicuously present.

Trade on the west coast brought Arabs, Jews, Persians, Europeans, Chinese, and people from the Malay Peninsula to South India. The empire's expansion encouraged migration, introducing new cultures and skills. Towns (Pattana or Pattanam) and marketplaces (Nagara or Nagaram) served as the nuclei of urban life. Shravanabelagola, for example, developed from a religious settlement in the 7th century into an important trading center by the 12th century with the arrival of wealthy merchants. Belur also grew into a regal city with the construction of the Chennakesava Temple under Vishnuvardhana. Large temples supported by royal patronage served not only religious but also social, economic, and judicial functions, employing artisans, sculptors, priests, and administrators. Temple building was a shared activity across religions and regions, with merchants and landlords financing temples to serve fiscal, political, cultural, and religious needs of agrarian communities, helping sustain local economies and social structures.

=== Literature ===
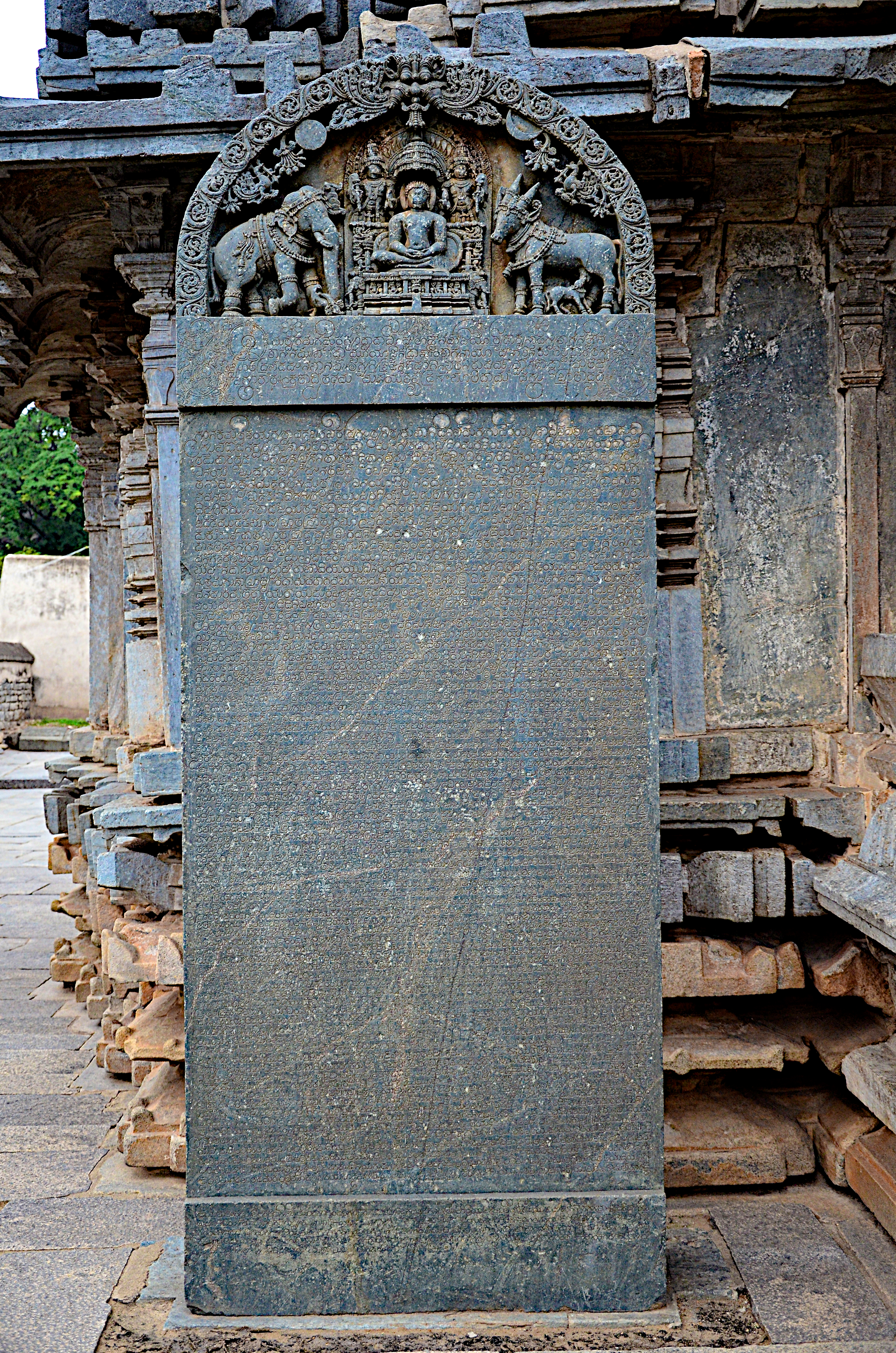
Old Kannada inscription dated to 1182 of King Veera Ballala II at Akkana Basadi, Shravanabelagola.

The Hoysala period was marked by significant literary activity in Kannada, with notable contributions from Jain, Shaiva and Vaishnava Brahmin writers. Janna the court poet of Veera Ballala II gained renown for his Yashodhara Charite, a classic of Kannada literature. Keshiraja, the Kannada gramarian and author of Shabdamanidarpana also flourished under Hoysala patronage.

Jain centers at Shravanabelagola and Kambadahalli, where astronomy and mathematics were taught, were important centers of learning. Jain mathematicians such as Rajaditya wrote seminal works on arithmetic and geometry including Vyavaharaganita, and Mahaviracharya's Ganitasarasangraha became a standard mathematical text. Inscriptions attest to Jain Saints maintaining centers for astronomical and mathematical studies under Hoysala patronage. This period saw a particularly strong Jain contribution to Kannada literature. The historian R. Narasimhacharya notes that more Jains wrote in Kannada during this period than in any other Dravidian language.

The period also saw innovation in Kannada poetic forms. The Sangatya metre became popular in compositions, while the Shatpadi (six-line), Tripadi (three-line) metres, and Ragale (lyrical blank verse) became fashionable, allowing greater variety and expressiveness in verse. Jain works continued to extol the virtues of Jain Tirthankaras, preserving religious and ethical themes.

Brahminical writers also contributed significantly. Rudrabhatta, patronized by Chandramouli, a minister of Veera Ballala II, wrote Jagannatha Vijaya in the Champu style, narrating the life of Krishna up to his battle with Banasura, drawing on the Vishnu Purana and similar traditions. Harihara (also known as Harisvara), a poet patronized by King Narasimha I, wrote Girijakalyana in the Champu style, recounting the marriage of Shiva and Parvati in ten sections. A native of Halebidu from a family of accountants ("Karanikas"), Harihara wrote over one hundred ragales in praise of Virupaksha (a form of Shiva). Raghavanka introduced the Shatpadi metre into Kannada literature with his Harishchandra Kavya, which is considered a classic despite occasional departures from strict grammatical rules.

=== Architecture ===
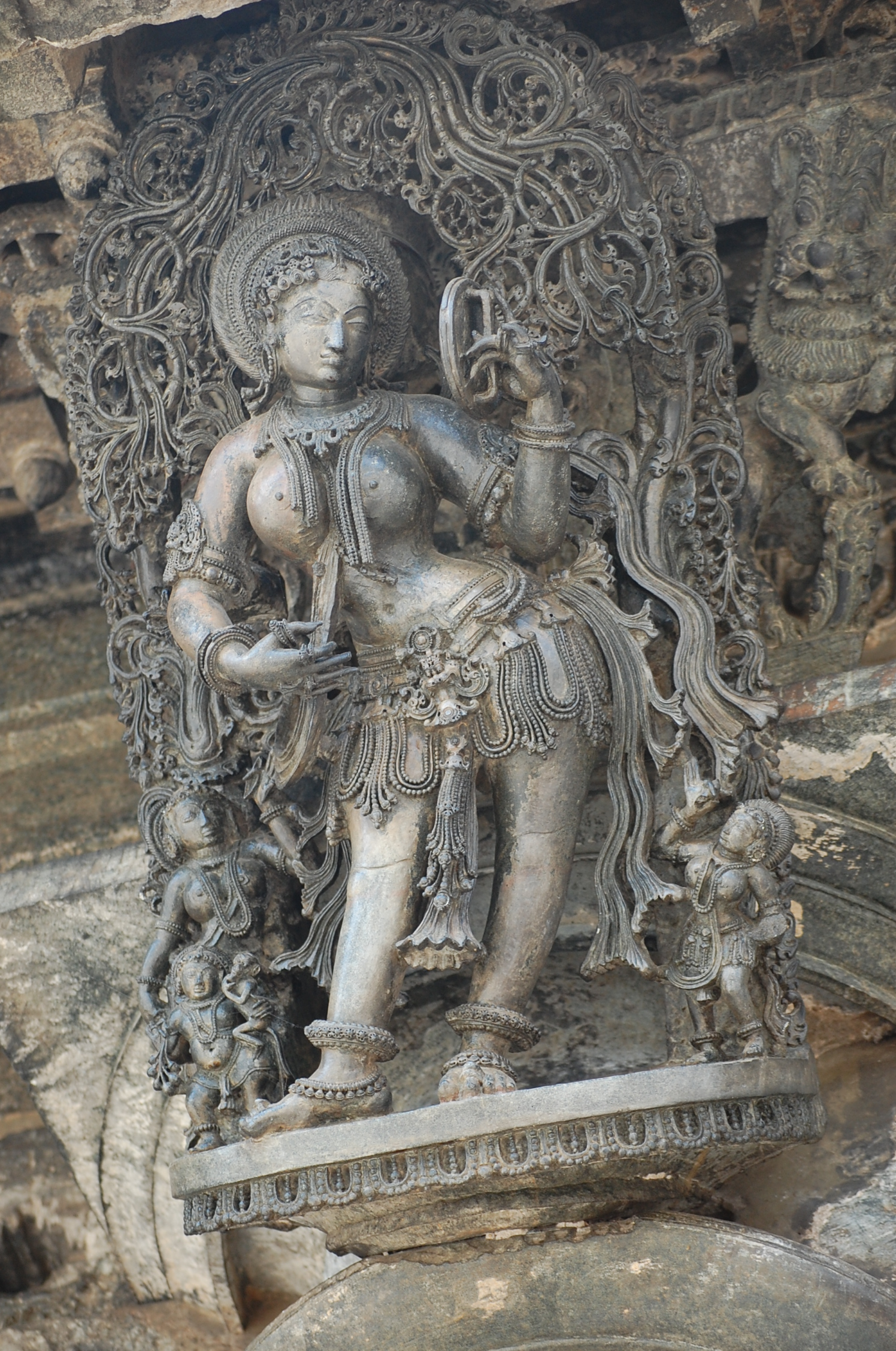
"Darpanasundari" (lady with a mirror), one of the many madanakai decorating the Chennakeshava Temple, Belur.

The modern interest in the Hoysalas is due to their patronage of art and architecture rather than their military conquests. The brisk temple building throughout the Kingdom was accomplished despite constant threats from the Pandyas to the south and the Seunas Yadavas to the north. Their architectural style, an offshoot of the Western Chalukya style, shows distinct Dravidian influences. The Hoysala architecture style is described as Karnata Dravida as distinguished from the traditional Dravida, and is considered an independent architectural tradition with many unique features.

A feature of Hoysala temple architecture is its attention to exquisite detail and skilled craftsmanship. The tower over the temple shrine (vimana) is delicately finished with intricate carvings, showing attention to the ornate and elaborately detailed rather than to a tower form and height. The stellate design of the base of the shrine with its rhythmic projections and recesses is carried through the tower in an orderly succession of decorated tiers. (Note: This is a Hoysala innovation.) Hoysala temple sculpture replicates this emphasis on delicacy and craftsmanship in its focus on depicting feminine beauty, grace and physique. The Hoysala artists achieved this with the use of Soapstone (Chloritic schist), a soft stone as basic building and sculptural material.

The Chennakesava Temple at Belur (1117), the Hoysaleswara Temple at Halebidu (1121), the Chennakesava Temple at Somanathapura (1279), the temples at Arasikere (1220), Amruthapura (1196), Belavadi (1200), Nuggehalli (1246), Hosaholalu (1250), Aralaguppe (1250), Korvangla (1173), Haranhalli (1235), Mosale and Basaralu (1234) are some of the notable examples of Hoysala art. While the temples at Belur and Halebidu are the best known because of the beauty of their sculptures, the Hoysala art finds more complete expression in the smaller and lesser known temples. The outer walls of all these temples contain an intricate array of stone sculptures and horizontal friezes (decorative mouldings) that depict the Hindu epics. These depictions are generally clockwise in the traditional direction of circumambulation (pradakshina). The temple of Halebidu has been described as an outstanding example of Hindu architecture and an important milestone in Indian architecture. The temples at Belur, Halebidu and Somanathapura were designated as UNESCO world heritage sites in 2023.

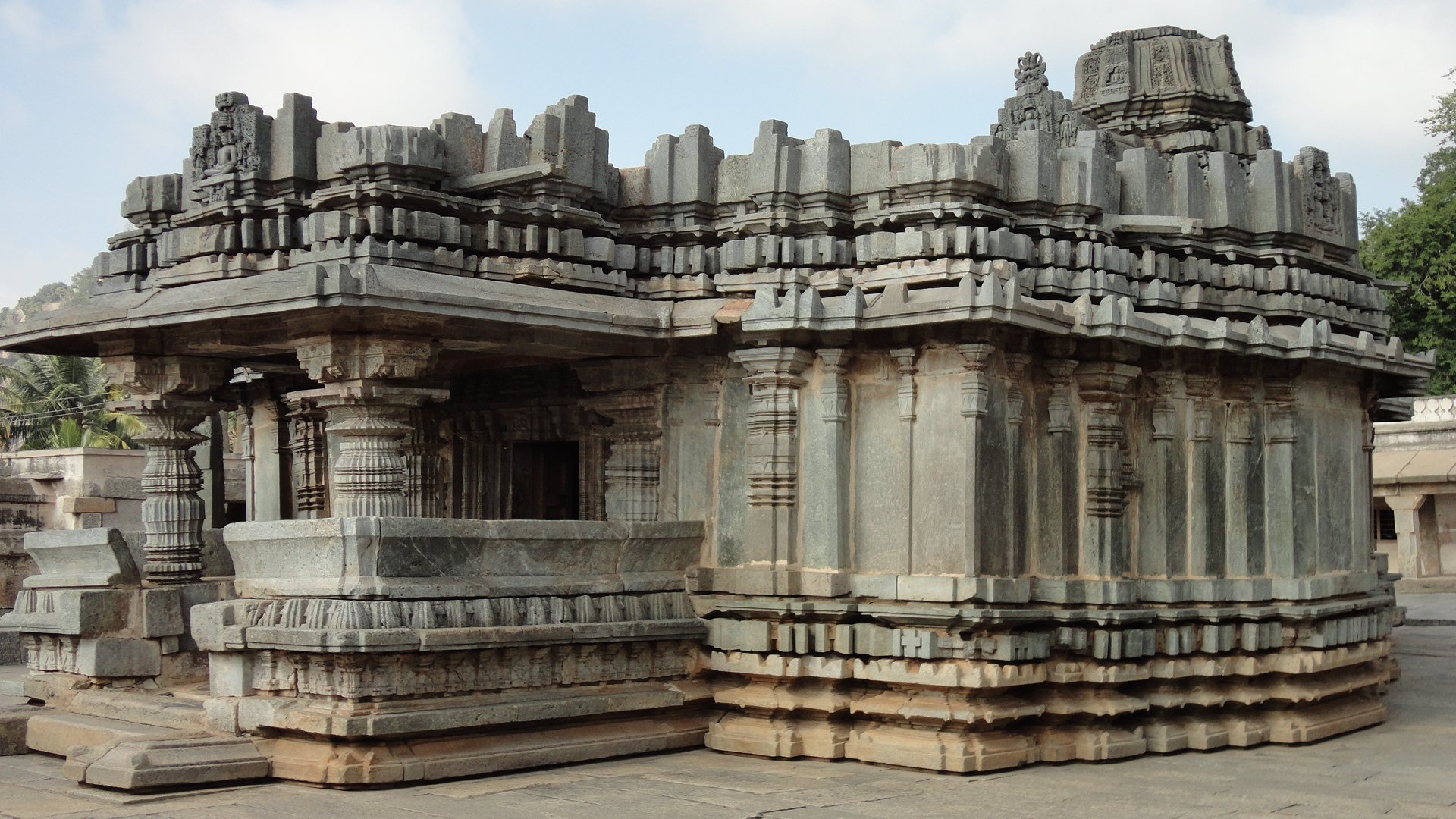
Akkana Basadi, Shravanabelagola

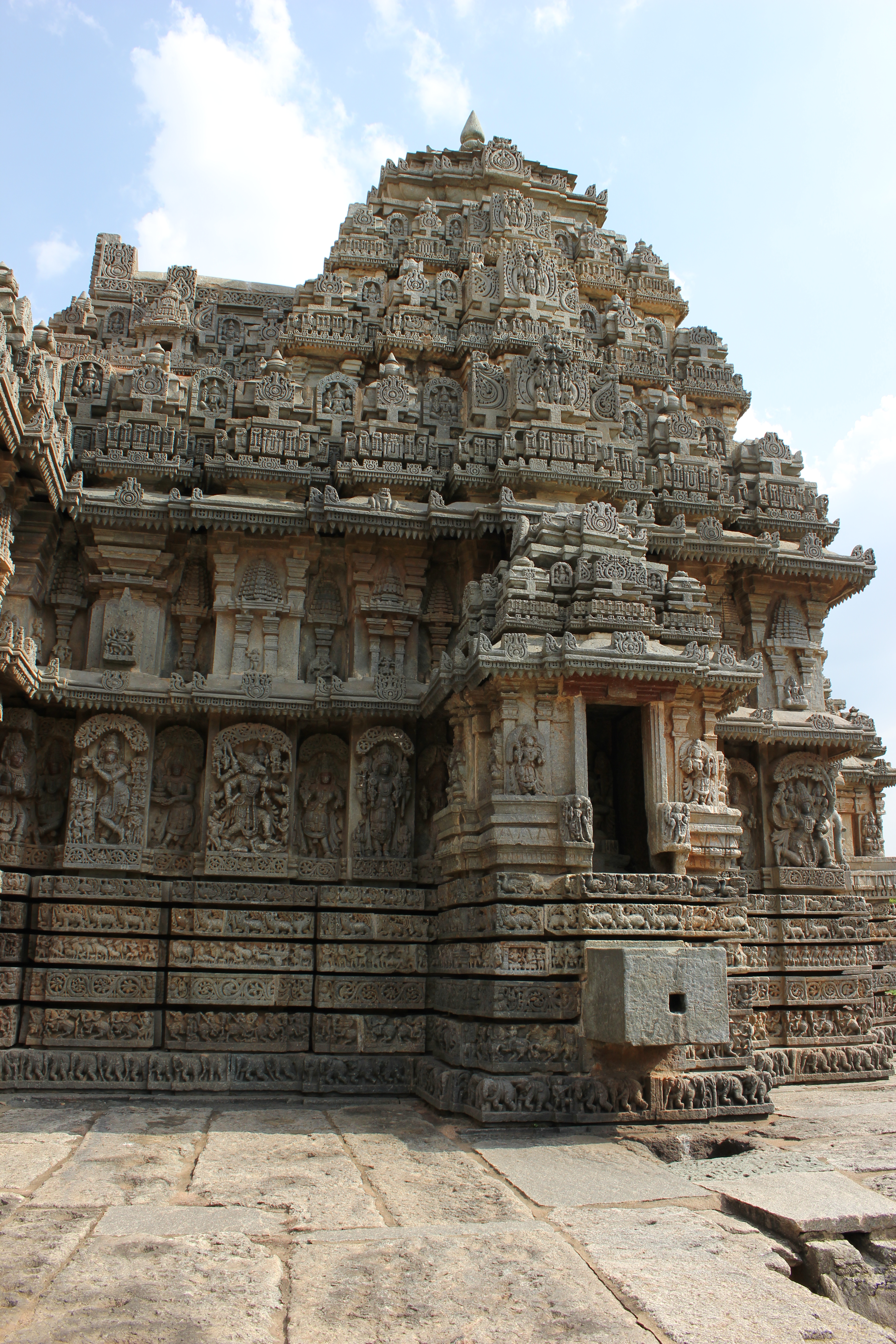
Vesara style Vimana of the Lakshmi Narasimha temple at Nuggehalli (1246 CE)

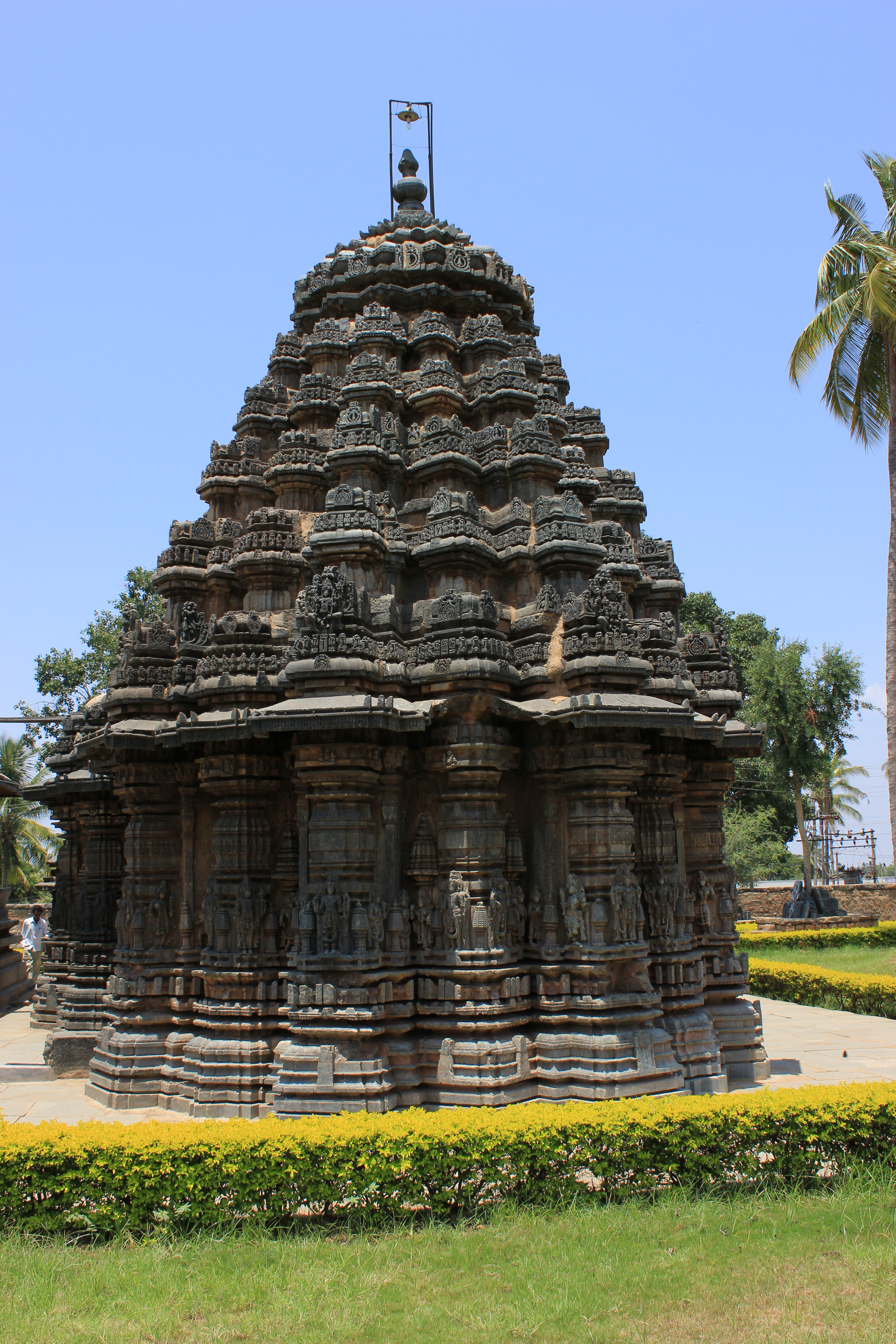
Stellate Vimana, at Ishvara Temple (Arasikere) built in 1220 CE

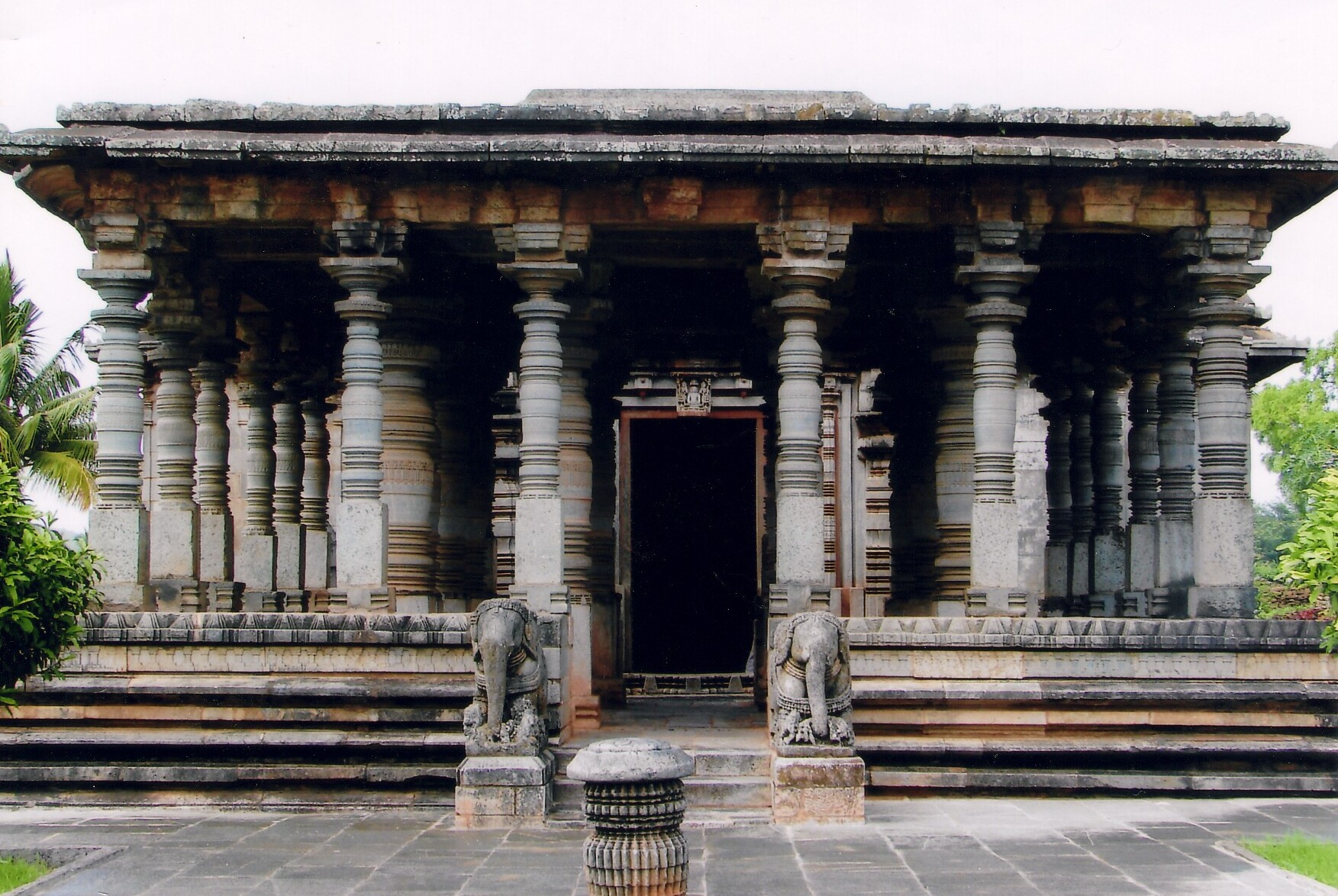
Jain temples, Halebidu

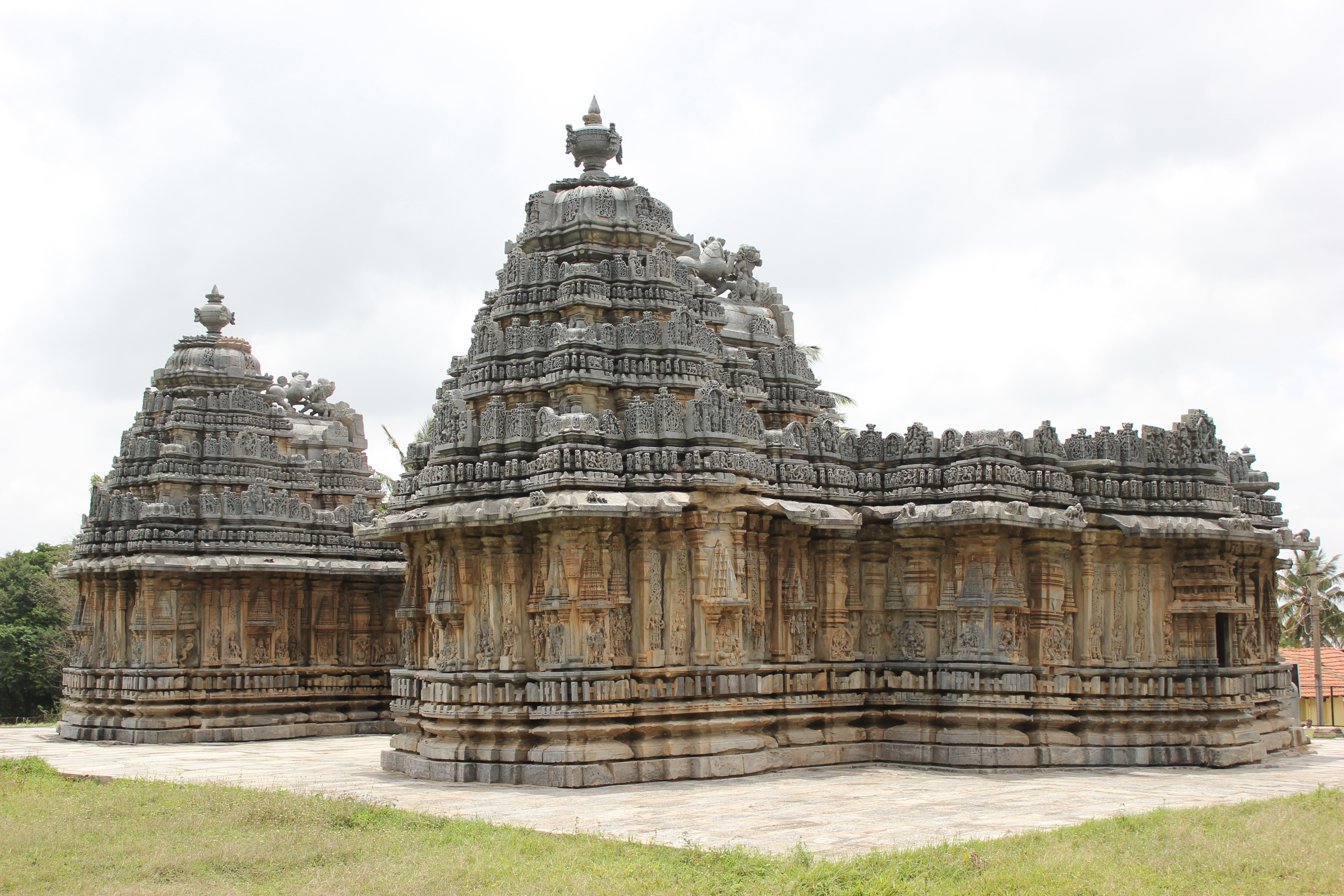
Twin temples (1200 CE) at Mosale, the Nageshvara (near) and Chennakeshava temple (far)

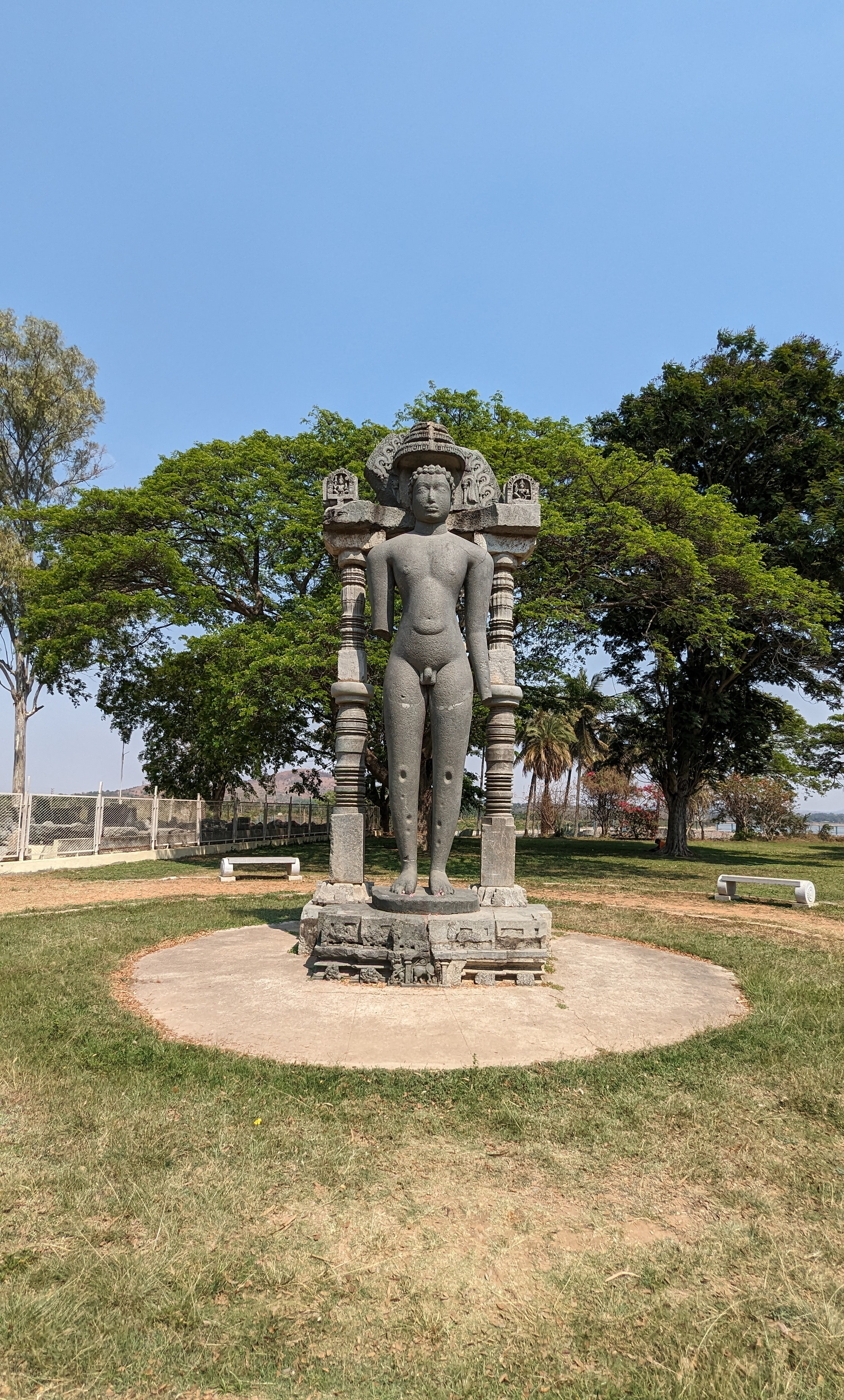
Jain statue, Dwarasamudra

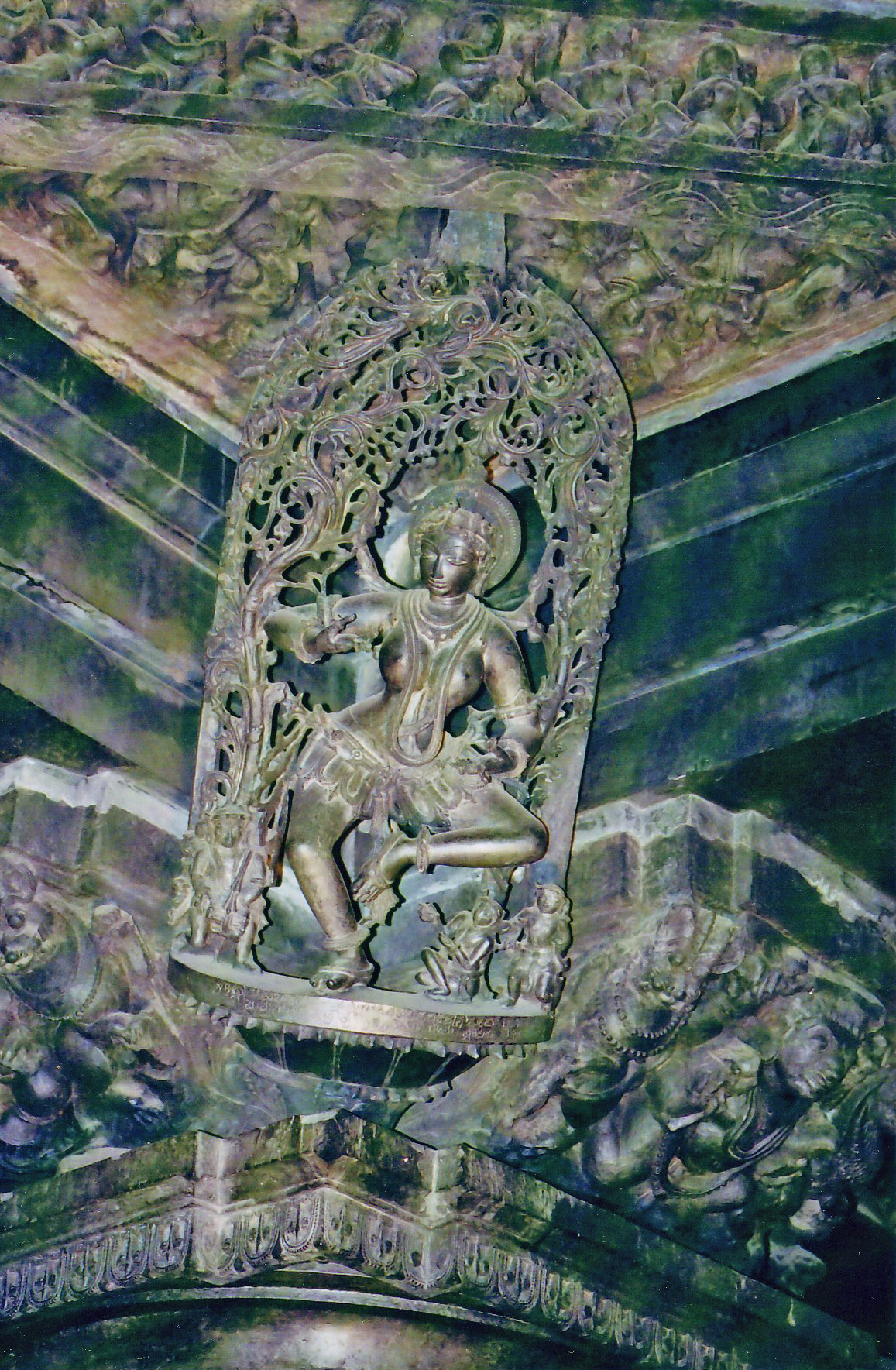
A sculpture of a dancer on pillar bracket, 1117 CE, (Shilabaalika or Madanika) in the Chennakeshava temple at Belur

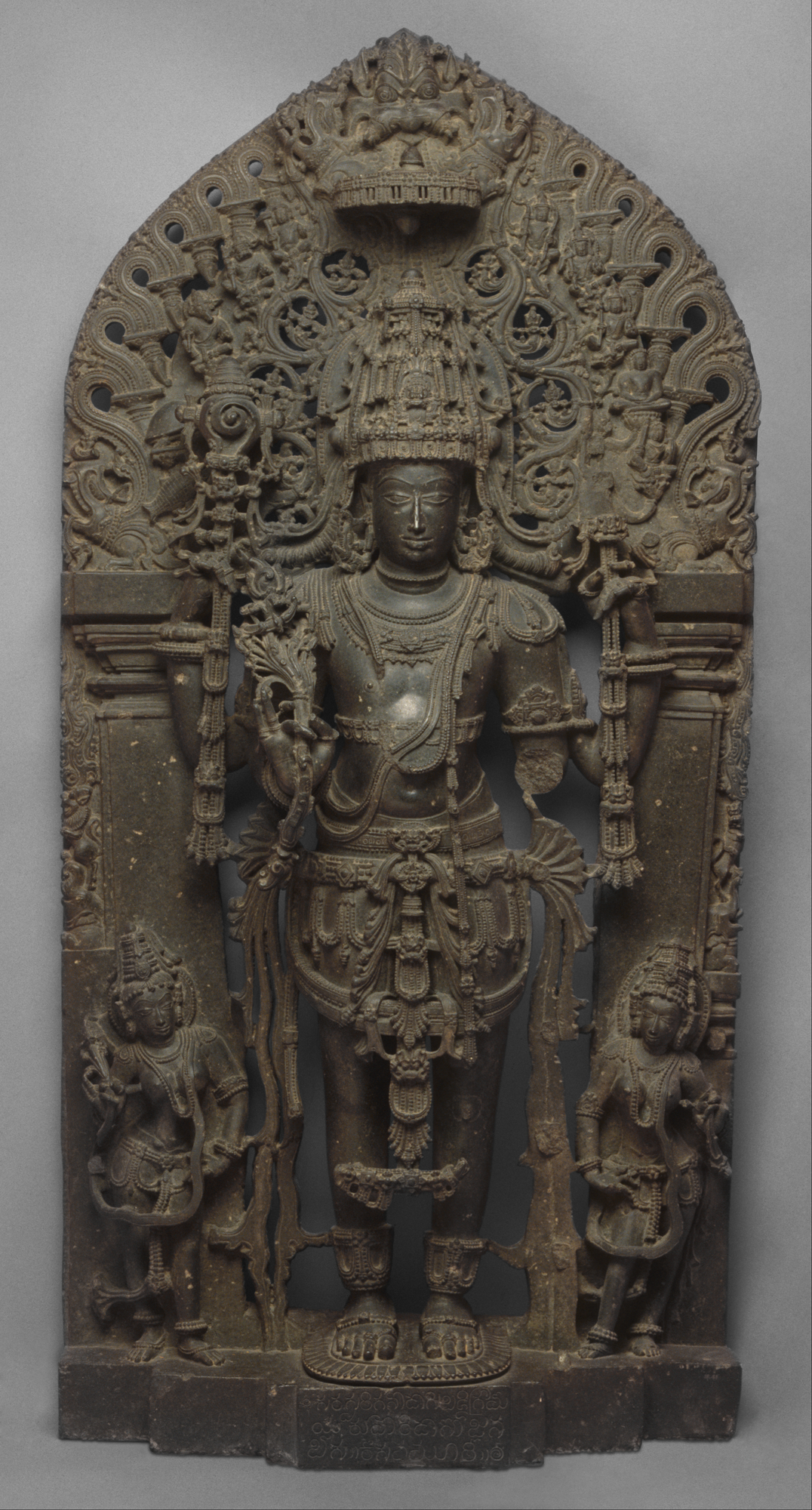
Standing Vishnu as Keshava, 1st quarter of the 12th century, Hoysala period, probably Belur, Karnataka, India

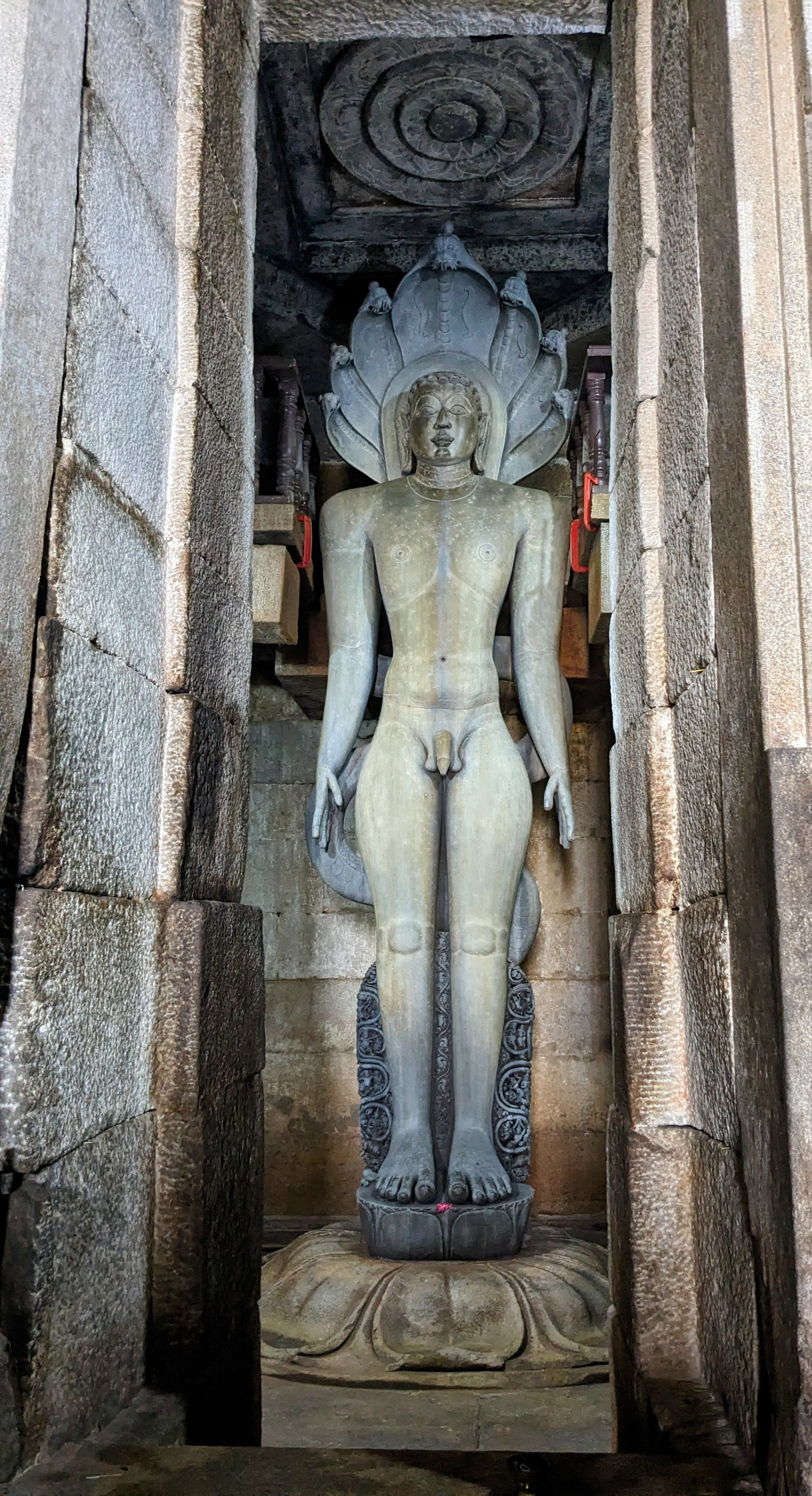
Statue Of Parshwanath, Hoysala Monuments

=== Language ===
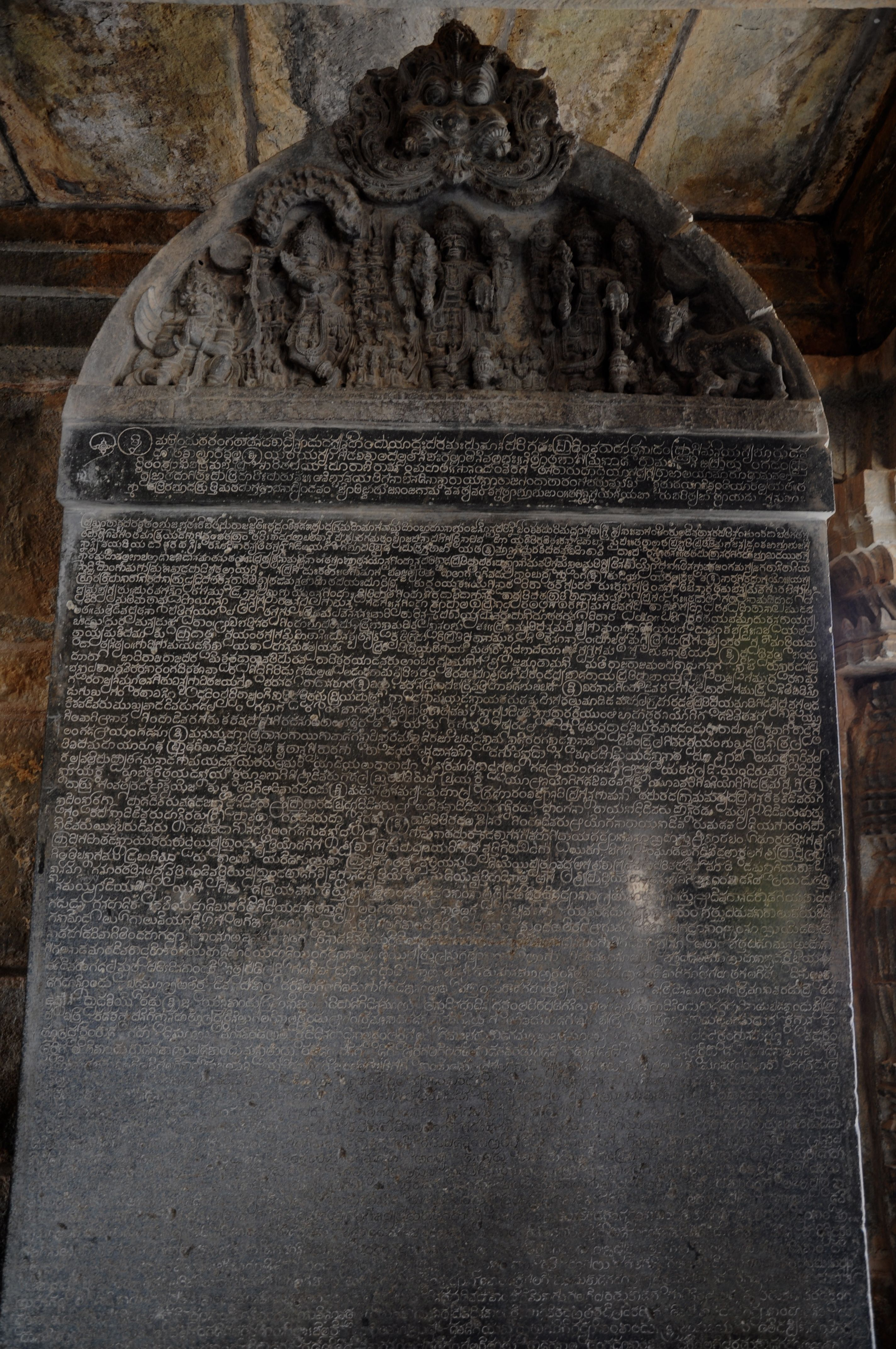
Old Kannada inscription (1270 CE) of King Narasimha III at Keshava Temple, Somanathapura.

The Hoysala rulers strongly supported the Kannada language, as seen in their inscriptions often composed in polished, poetic Kannada with decorative floral designs in the margins. According to historian Sheldon Pollock, the Hoysala era marked the near-complete displacement of Sanskrit in favor of Kannada as the primary courtly and administrative language.

Jain and Buddhist monasteries educated novice monks, while schools of higher learning were called ghatikas. Temples often served as local schools where learned Brahmins taught in Sanskrit. The local Kannada language, however, was widely used in the devotional movements that emphasized an intimate experience of the divine. Literary works were written on palm leaves bound together. While earlier centuries had seen Jain works dominate Kannada literature, the Hoysala period also witnessed the rise of Hindu and early Brahminical works.

Sanskrit continued to be used for poetry, grammar, lexicons, manuals, rhetoric, commentaries, prose fiction, and drama. Inscriptions on stone (shilashasana) and copper plates (tamarashasana) were mostly in Kannada, though some were in Sanskrit or bilingual. Typically, the titles, genealogies, origin myths, and benedictions appeared in Sanskrit, while the terms of grants—including land boundaries, participation of local authorities, rights and obligations, taxes, and witnesses—were in Kannada to ensure clarity for local communities.

== List of Monarchs ==
Regnal names	Reign
Sala (Hoysala Dynasty)	
Arekalla	950-960
Maruga	960-976
Nripa Kama I	976-1006
Munda (Hoysala)	1006-1026
Nripa Kama II	1026–1047
Vinayaditya	1047–1098
Ereyanga	1098–1102
Veera Ballala I	1102–1108
Vishnuvardhana	1108–1152
Narasimha I	1152–1173
Veera Ballala II	1173–1220
Narasimha II	1220–1234
Someshwara	1234–1263
Narasimha III	1263–1292
Veera Ballala III	1292–1342/43
Veera Ballala IV	1342/43-1346

== Bibliography ==
- Ayyar, P. V. Jagadisa (1993) [1920]. South Indian Shrines. Asian Educational Services. ISBN 978-81-206-0151-2.
- Chopra, P.N.; Ravindran, T.K.; Subrahmanian, N. (2003). History of South India (Ancient, Medieval and Modern) Part 1. New Delhi: Chand Publications. ISBN 978-81-219-0153-6.
- Desai, Pandurang Bhimarao; Ritti, Shrinivas; Gopal, B. R. (1970). A History of Karnataka: from pre-history to unification. Dharwar: Kannada Research Institute, Karnatak University. OCLC 203297.
- Foekema, Gerard (1996). A Complete Guide To Hoysala Temples. New Delhi: Abhinav. ISBN 978-81-7017-345-8.
- Fritz, John M.; Michell, George, eds. (2001). New Light on Hampi: Recent Research at Vijayanagar. Mumbai: MARG. ISBN 81-85026-53-X.
- Hardy, Adam (1995). Indian Temple Architecture: Form and Transformation -The Karnata Dravida Tradition 7th to 13th Centuries. Abhinav Publications. ISBN 978-81-7017-312-0.
- Kamath, Suryanath U. (2001). A Concise History of Karnataka: from pre-historic times to the present. Bangalore: Jupiter Books. LCCN 80905179. OCLC 7796041.
- Keay, John (2000). India: a history. New York: Atlantic Monthly Press. ISBN 9780802195500.
- Kumar, B. Pandu (2006). "Agrarian System of the Hoysalas: as depiction in the inscriptions". Proceedings of the Indian History Congress. 67. Indian History Congress: 217–223. ISSN 2249-1937. JSTOR 44147940.
- Menon, Indira (2013). Rhythms in Stone: The Temples of South India. New Delhi: Ambi Knowledge Resources. p. 128. ISBN 9788190359139.
- Narasimhacharya, R. (1988). History of Kannada Literature. New Delhi; Madras: Asian Educational Services. ISBN 978-81-206-0303-5.
- Nayaka, Hanuma (2003). "Merchants as Agents of the State under the Hoysalas". Proceedings of the Indian History Congress. 64. Indian History Congress: 238–246. ISSN 2249-1937. JSTOR 44145465.
- Pollock, Sheldon (2006). The Language of Gods in the World of Men: Sanskrit, Culture and Power in Pre-modern India. Berkeley and London: University of California Press. ISBN 978-0-520-24500-6.
- Rice, Edward P. (1982) [1921]. A History of Kannada Literature (2nd ed.). New Delhi: Asian Educational Services. ISBN 978-81-206-0063-8.
- Settar, Sadakshara (1986). The Hoysala temples. Karnatak University, Dharwad.
- Sastri, K.A. Nilakanta (1955). A History of South India from Prehistoric Times to the Fall of Vijayanagar. New Delhi: Oxford University Press. OCLC 1035966644.
- Sen, Sailendra Nath (1999). Ancient Indian History and Civilization (2nd ed.). New Age Publishers. ISBN 978-81-224-1198-0.
- Sen, Sailendra (2013). A Textbook of Medieval Indian History. Primus Books. ISBN 978-93-80607-34-4.
- Seshan, Radhika; Kumbhojkar, Shraddha (2018). Re-searching Transitions in Indian History. London; New York: Routledge. ISBN 9780429487569. OCLC 1041706962.
- Shiva Prakash, H.S. (1997). "Kannada". In Ayyappapanicker (ed.). Medieval Indian Literature: an anthology. Vol. 2. Sahitya Akademi. ISBN 978-81-260-0365-5.
- Thapar, Romila (2002). The Penguin History of Early India: from the origins to AD 1300. New Delhi: Penguin Books. ISBN 978-0-14-302989-2.
- Van der Geer, Alexandra Anna Enrica (2008). Animals in Stone: Indian Mammals Sculptured Through Time. Leiden: Brill Publishers. ISBN 978-90-04-16819-0.
- Settar, Sadakshara (1975). Jaina Art and Architecture, Vol. 2. Bharatiya Jnanpith.
- Sangave, Vilas Adinath (1981). The Sacred Śravaṇa Beḷgoḷa: A Socio‑Religious Study. Bharatiya Jnanpith.
- "Belur proposal for World Heritage Status". The Hindu. Chennai, India. 25 July 2004. Archived from the original on 22 October 2004.
- "Hoysala Temples of Belur, by K. L. Kamat, 04 November 2006". © 1996–2006 Kamat's Potpourri. Archived from the original on 2 January 2011.
- Nagarajaiah, Hampa (1999). Jainism in Southern Karnataka. Bangalore: Sapna Book House. OCLC 45166444.

=== Further reading ===
- Desai, Pandurang Bhimarao; Ritti, Shrinivas; Gopal, B. R. (1970). A History of Karnataka: from pre-history to unification. Dharwar: Kannada Research Institute, Karnatak University. OCLC 203297.
- Derrett, J.; Duncan, M. (1957). The Hoysalas: a medieval Indian royal family. London: Oxford University Press. OCLC 1070864216.
- Foekema, Gerard (2003). Architecture Decorated with Architecture: later medieval temples of Karnataka, 1000–1300 AD. New Delhi: Munshiram Manoharlal Publishers Pvt. Ltd. ISBN 81-215-1089-9.
- Keay, John (2000). India: a history. New York: Atlantic Monthly Press. ISBN 9780802195500.
- Kumar, B. Pandu (2006). "Agrarian System of the Hoysalas: as depiction in the inscriptions". Proceedings of the Indian History Congress. 67. Indian History Congress: 217–223. ISSN 2249-1937. JSTOR 44147940.
- Menon, Indira (2013). Rhythms in Stone: The Temples of South India. New Delhi: Ambi Knowledge Resources. p. 128. ISBN 9788190359139.

Timeline and cultural period	Indus plain (Punjab-Sapta Sindhu-Gujarat)	Gangetic Plain			Central India	Southern India
Timeline and cultural period	Indus plain (Punjab-Sapta Sindhu-Gujarat)	Upper Gangetic Plain (Ganga-Yamuna doab)	Middle Gangetic Plain	Lower Gangetic Plain	Central India	Southern India
IRON AGE
Culture	Late Vedic Period	Late Vedic Period; Painted Grey Ware culture	Late Vedic Period; Northern Black Polished Ware		Pre-history	
6th century BCE	Gandhara	Kuru-Panchala	Magadha		Adivasi (tribes)	Assaka
Culture	Persian-Greek influences	"Second Urbanisation"; Rise of Shramana movements Jainism - Buddhism - Ājīvika - Yoga			Pre-history	
5th century BCE	(Persian conquests)		Shaishunaga dynasty		Adivasi (tribes)	Assaka
4th century BCE	(Greek conquests)	Nanda empire				
HISTORICAL AGE
Culture	Spread of Buddhism				Pre-history	
3rd century BCE	Maurya Empire					Satavahana dynasty Sangam period (300 BCE – 200 CE); Early Cholas; Early Pandyan kingdom Cheras
Culture	Preclassical Hinduism (Note: Michaels (2004) p.39) - "Hindu Synthesis" (Note: Hiltebeitel (2002)) (ca. 200 BCE - 300 CE) (Note: Michaels (2004) p.39) (Note: Hiltebeitel (2002)); Epics - Puranas - Ramayana - Mahabharata - Bhagavad Gita - Brahma Sutras - Smarta Tradition; Mahayana Buddhism					
2nd century BCE	Indo-Greek Kingdom		Shunga Empire; Maha-Meghavahana Dynasty			Satavahana dynasty Sangam period (300 BCE – 200 CE); Early Cholas; Early Pandyan kingdom Cheras
1st century BCE	Indo-Greek Kingdom		Shunga Empire; Maha-Meghavahana Dynasty			Satavahana dynasty Sangam period (300 BCE – 200 CE); Early Cholas; Early Pandyan kingdom Cheras
1st century CE	Indo-Scythians; Indo-Parthians		Kuninda Kingdom			Satavahana dynasty Sangam period (300 BCE – 200 CE); Early Cholas; Early Pandyan kingdom Cheras
2nd century	Kushan Empire					Satavahana dynasty Sangam period (300 BCE – 200 CE); Early Cholas; Early Pandyan kingdom Cheras
3rd century	Kushano-Sasanian Kingdom; Western Satraps	Kushan Empire		Kamarupa kingdom	Adivasi (tribes)	Satavahana dynasty Sangam period (300 BCE – 200 CE); Early Cholas; Early Pandyan kingdom Cheras
Culture	"Golden Age of Hinduism"(ca. CE 320-650) (Note: Michaels (2004) p.40); Puranas - Kural; Co-existence of Hinduism and Buddhism					
4th century	Kidarites	Gupta Empire; Varman dynasty				Andhra Ikshvakus; Kalabhra dynasty Kadamba Dynasty; Western Ganga Dynasty
5th century	Hephthalite Empire	Alchon Huns				Vishnukundina; Kalabhra dynasty
6th century	Nezak Huns; Kabul Shahi; Maitraka				Adivasi (tribes)	Vishnukundina; Badami Chalukyas; Kalabhra dynasty
Culture	Late-Classical Hinduism (ca. CE 650-1100) (Note: Michaels (2004) p.41); Advaita Vedanta - Tantra; Decline of Buddhism in India					
7th century	Indo-Sassanids		Vakataka dynasty Empire of Harsha	Mlechchha dynasty	Adivasi (tribes)	Badami Chalukyas; Eastern Chalukyas; Pandyan kingdom (revival); Pallava
7th century	Karkota dynasty				Adivasi (tribes)	
8th century	Kabul Shahi	Pala Empire			Adivasi (tribes)	Eastern Chalukyas; Pandyan kingdom Kalachuri
9th century	Gurjara-Pratihara				Adivasi (tribes)	Rashtrakuta Empire; Eastern Chalukyas; Pandyan kingdom Medieval Cholas; Chera Perumals of Makkotai
10th century	Ghaznavids			Pala dynasty Kamboja-Pala dynasty	Adivasi (tribes)	Kalyani Chalukyas; Eastern Chalukyas; Medieval Cholas; Chera Perumals of Makkotai; Rashtrakuta
References and sources for table References Sources: Flood, Gavin D. (1996), An Introduction to Hinduism, Cambridge University Press; Hiltebeitel, Alf (2002), Hinduism. In: Joseph Kitagawa, "The Religious Traditions of Asia: Religion, History, and Culture", Routledge; Michaels, Axel (2004), Hinduism. Past and present, Princeton, New Jersey: Princeton University Press
