= Nripa Kama I =

Hoysala King
- Reign: c. 976 – c. 1006 CE
- Predecessor: Maruga
- Successor: Munda
- Dynasty: Hoysala

Nripa Kama I (976-1006) was an early ruler of the Hoysala dynasty in the Malenadu region of Karnataka, India, active around c. 976 CE. He is traditionally listed as one of the earliest significant chiefs of the dynasty, succeeding Maruga and preceding Munda (1006–1026 CE) in the Hoysala genealogies.

Nripa Kama I is notable for being among the first Hoysala rulers to carry the title "Permandi", which suggests an early alliance with the Western Ganga dynasty, then the dominant power in southern Karnataka. This period marked the gradual rise of the Hoysalas from local Malnad chieftains to feudatories of larger empires such as the Western Chalukyas.

Though inscriptions about his reign are limited, Nripa Kama I is credited with consolidating Hoysala control over parts of the Malnad and laying the groundwork for the dynasty’s later expansion under rulers like Vishnuvardhana. His reign is an important transitional phase in the evolution of the Hoysalas from small chiefs to powerful regional kings.
