= Nripa Kama II =

Hoysala King from 1026 to 1047 CE

Hoysala King
- Reign: c. 1026 – c. 1047 CE
- Predecessor: Munda
- Successor: Vinayaditya
- Dynasty: Hoysala
- Religion: Jainism

Nripa Kama II (r. 1026–1047 CE) was an early king of the Hoysala Empire from the Malnad region of Karnataka and was possibly a vassal of the Western Ganga Dynasty and fought many wars against the Cholas. Though unable to rout the Cholas from southern regions of present-day Karnataka, he successfully ruled some regions in the Malnad area.

== Sources ==
- Suryanath U. Kamath (1980), A Concise history of Karnataka from pre-historic times to the present, Jupiter books, MCC, Bangalore, 1980 (Reprinted 2001, 2002) OCLC: 7796041

Preceded by Munda	Hoysala; 1026–1047	Succeeded by Vinayaditya
