= Veera Ballala I =

Hoysala King from 1102 to 1108

Hoysala King
- Reign: c. 1102 – c. 1108
- Predecessor: Ereyanga
- Successor: Vishnuvardhana
- Dynasty: Hoysala
- Religion: Jainism

Veera Ballala I (r. 1102–1108) succeeded Ereyanga as king of the Hoysala Empire. He was a Jain by faith. His rule was short and uneventful other than subduing the Chengalvas and the Santharas. He made some unsuccessful attempts to end the overlordship of the Western Chalukyas but was brought under control by Chalukya Vikramaditya VI.

According to Sen, his rule was from 1100 to 1110 with the capital at Belur. An alternate capital was at Halebidu. He was succeeded by his younger brother Vishnuvardhana.

== Sources ==
- Dr. Suryanath U. Kamat, A Concise history of Karnataka from pre-historic times to the present, Jupiter books, MCC, Bangalore, 2001 (Reprinted 2002) OCLC: 7796041

Preceded by Ereyanga	Hoysala; 1102–1108	Succeeded by Vishnuvardhana
