= Giriyal Kariyat Bagewadi =

- Village
- Country: India
- State: Karnataka
- District: Belgaum
- Taluk: Bailhongal

Population (2011)
  - Total: 609

Languages
  - Official: Kannada
- Time zone: UTC+5:30 (IST)

Giriyal Kariyat Bagewadi is a village in the Bailhongal taluk of Belgaum district in the southern Indian state of Karnataka. As of the 2011 Indian census, it had a population of 609.
