= Angadi =

- Village
- Location in Karnataka
- Coordinates: 13.223°N 75.470°E
- Country: India
- State: Karnataka
- District: Chikkamagaluru district
- Taluk: Mudigere taluk

Population (2011)
  - Total: 1,084

Languages
  - Official: Kannada
- Time zone: UTC+5:30 (IST)
- PIN: 577132
- Vehicle registration: KA-18

Angadi is a village in Mudigere taluk of Chikkamagaluru district, Karnataka, India. It is traditionally regarded as the original home of the Hoysala dynasty, and its considered the historical heart of Jainism where most Jain present at the time. The village is notable for its ruined Hoysala temples, Jain basadis, and the legendary site where the Hoysala founder Sala (Hoysala Dynasty) is believed to have slain a tiger.

== History ==
According to legend, Angadi—then known as Sosevur or Sasakapura—was the first capital of the Hoysalas. The dynasty’s founder, Sala, is said to have killed a tiger here at the call of his Jain preceptor Sudatta Muni. The act gave rise to the royal emblem and the name "Hoy-sala" ("Strike, Sala").

Though later rulers shifted their capitals to Belur and Halebidu, inscriptions and local traditions indicate that Angadi retained significance as a spiritual and ancestral site.

== Religious significance ==
Angadi was a prominent Jain religious centre Before 12th Century. The region remained free of animal sacrifice due to its Jain affiliation. Jain basadis dedicated to Neminatha and Chandraprabha still survive in ruined form in and around the village.

The area was Historically recorded as the centre of Jain education and ritual, with religious patronage from early Hoysala chiefs.

=== Temples ===
Several Hoysala-style temples are located in Angadi, including:

- Vasantika Temple(Originally A Jain Yakshini temple) – believed to be the site of Sala’s legendary tiger-slaying,
- Temples dedicated to Keshava, Veerabhadra, and Mallikarjuna,
- Jain basadis with early Hoysala architectural features.

These temples represent an earlier and simpler phase of Hoysala architecture, predating the ornate style seen in Belur and Halebidu.

== Legacy ==
Angadi Historically remains an important site for those interested in the Hoysala dynasty, Jain history, and medieval Karnataka. Though now a small village, its archaeological and cultural legacy is substantial, drawing occasional historians and travellers.

== See also ==
- Belur
- Halebidu
- Hoysala architecture
- Jainism in Karnataka

== Bibliography ==
- Sastri, K. A. Nilakanta (1955). A History of South India from Prehistoric Times to the Fall of Vijayanagar. Oxford University Press. pp. 357–361.
- Nagarajaiah, Hampa (1999). Jainism in Southern Karnataka. Bangalore: Sapna Book House. OCLC 45166444.
- "Cradle of a dynasty". Deccan Herald. 30 August 2008.
