= Vinayaditya (Hoysala dynasty) =

Hoysala King from 1047 to 1098 CE

Hoysala King
- Reign: c. 1047 – c. 1098 CE
- Predecessor: Nripa Kama II
- Successor: Veera Ballala I
- Dynasty: Hoysala
- Religion: Jainism

Vinayaditya (r. 1047 – 1098 CE) was an able Jain king of the Hoysala Empire, who distinguished himself as an able feudatory of the Kalyani Chalukyas during his long reign. He helped bring many small Malnad chiefs like the Kongalvas, Chengalvas, Santharas of Humcha Shimoga and the Kadambas of Bayalnadu (Vainadu) under control. After the complete disappearance of the Gangas during Chola occupation of Gangavadi, Vinayaditya brought some small portions of Gangavadi under his control. He was either a brother-in-law or father-in-law of Chalukya Someshvara I.

Vinayaditya conquered and ruled over South Kanara and Mysore. He was a great builder of cities and towns. He was succeeded by his grandson Veera Ballala I as Vinayaditya's son Ereyanga had predeceased him.

== Notes ==
Preceded by Nripa Kama II	Hoysala; 1047–1098	Succeeded by Ereyanga
