= Maruga =

Hoysala King
- Reign: 950/60
- Predecessor: Arekalla
- Successor: Nripa Kama I
- Dynasty: Hoysala

Maruga was an early chief of the Hoysala dynasty in the Malnad region of Karnataka, India. He is mentioned in traditional Hoysala genealogies as the successor of Arekalla, the earliest recorded ancestor of the dynasty.

Maruga ruled as a local chieftain during the 10th century CE, before the Hoysalas emerged as significant feudatories of the Western Chalukyas. Though inscriptions provide limited details about his reign, his place in the lineage indicates the gradual consolidation of Hoysala authority in the region. He was succeeded by Nripa Kama I (c. 976 CE), who is the first Hoysala ruler known to have taken the title Permandi, suggesting early alliances with the Western Ganga dynasty.
