= Vishnuvardhana =

Hoysala King from 1108 to 1152

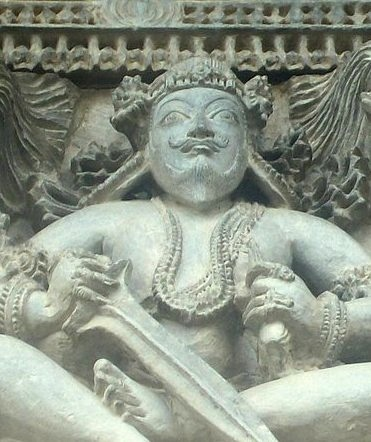
- Panel depicting Vishnuvardhana, at the Chennakesava Temple

Hoysala King
- Reign: c. 1108 – c. 1152
- Predecessor: Veera Ballala I
- Successor: Narasimha I
- Born: Bitti-deva
- Spouse: Shantala Devi, Lakshmidevi
- Dynasty: Hoysala
- Religion: Originally Jainism, converted to Vaishnavism

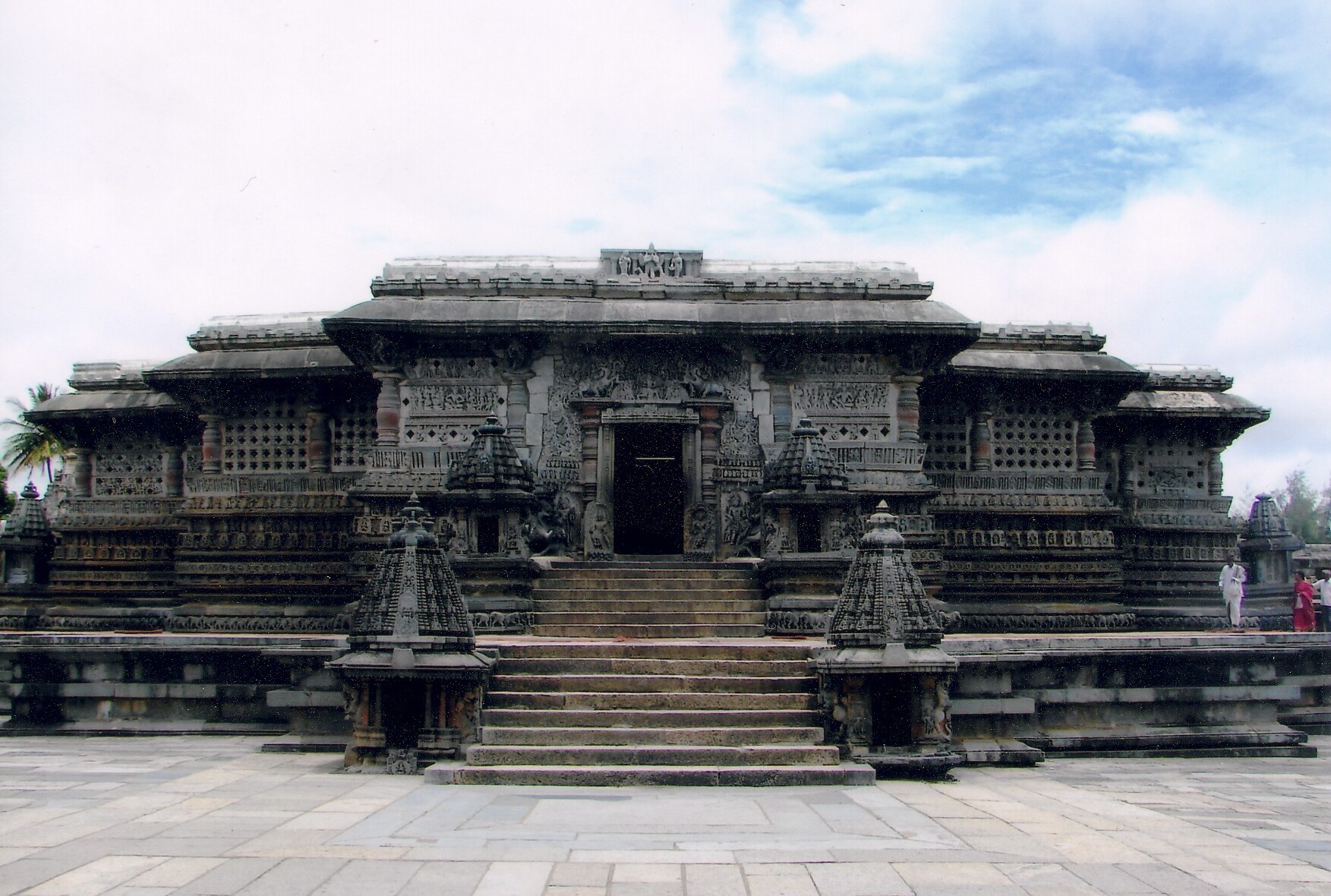
Chennakeshava Temple commissioned by Vishnuvardhana, Vesara architecture at Belur

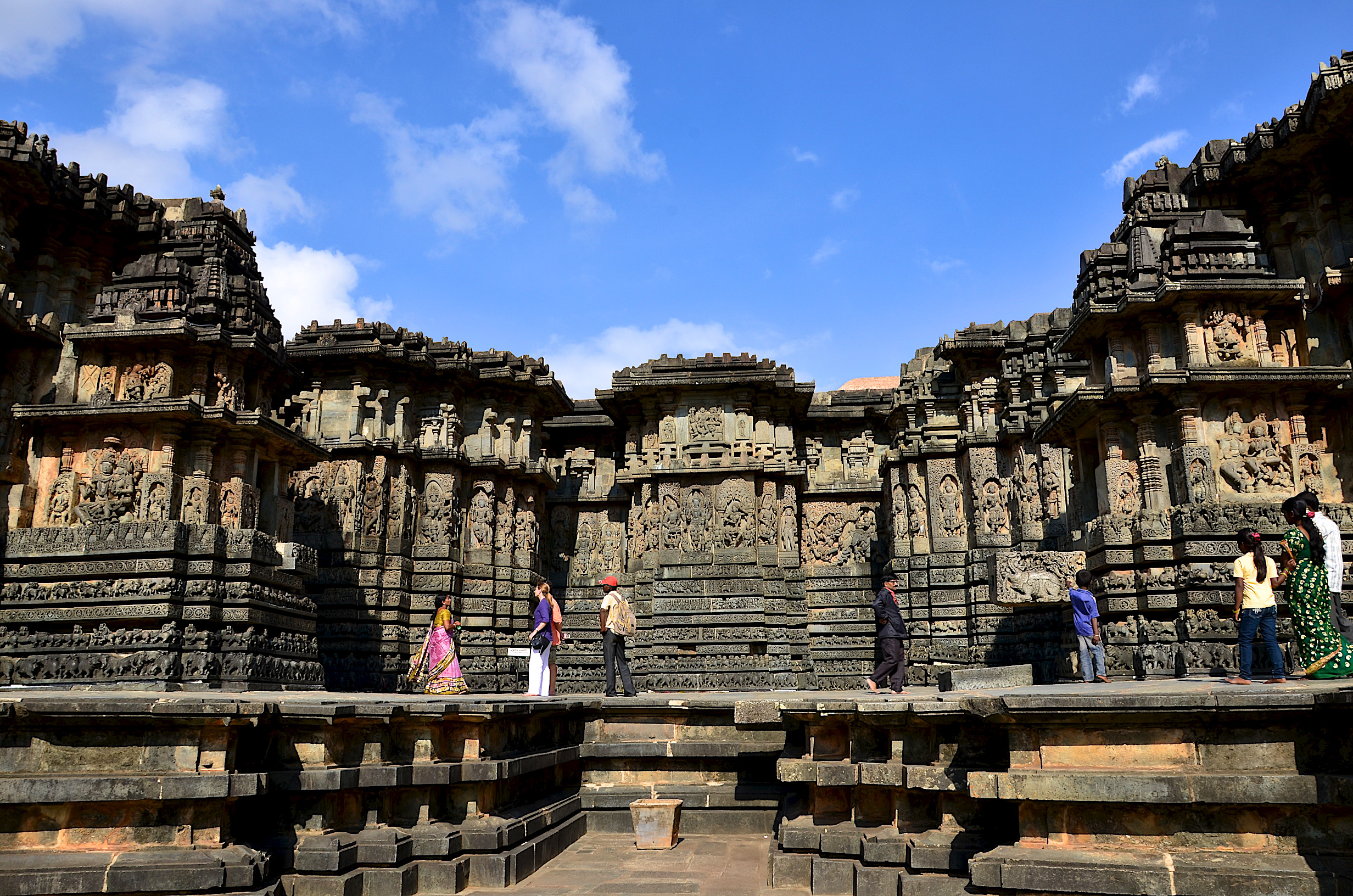
The Hoysaleshwara Temple at Halebidu was financed by Ketamalla and Kesarasetti, rich merchants who dedicated it to King Vishnuvardhana and his queen Shantaladevi

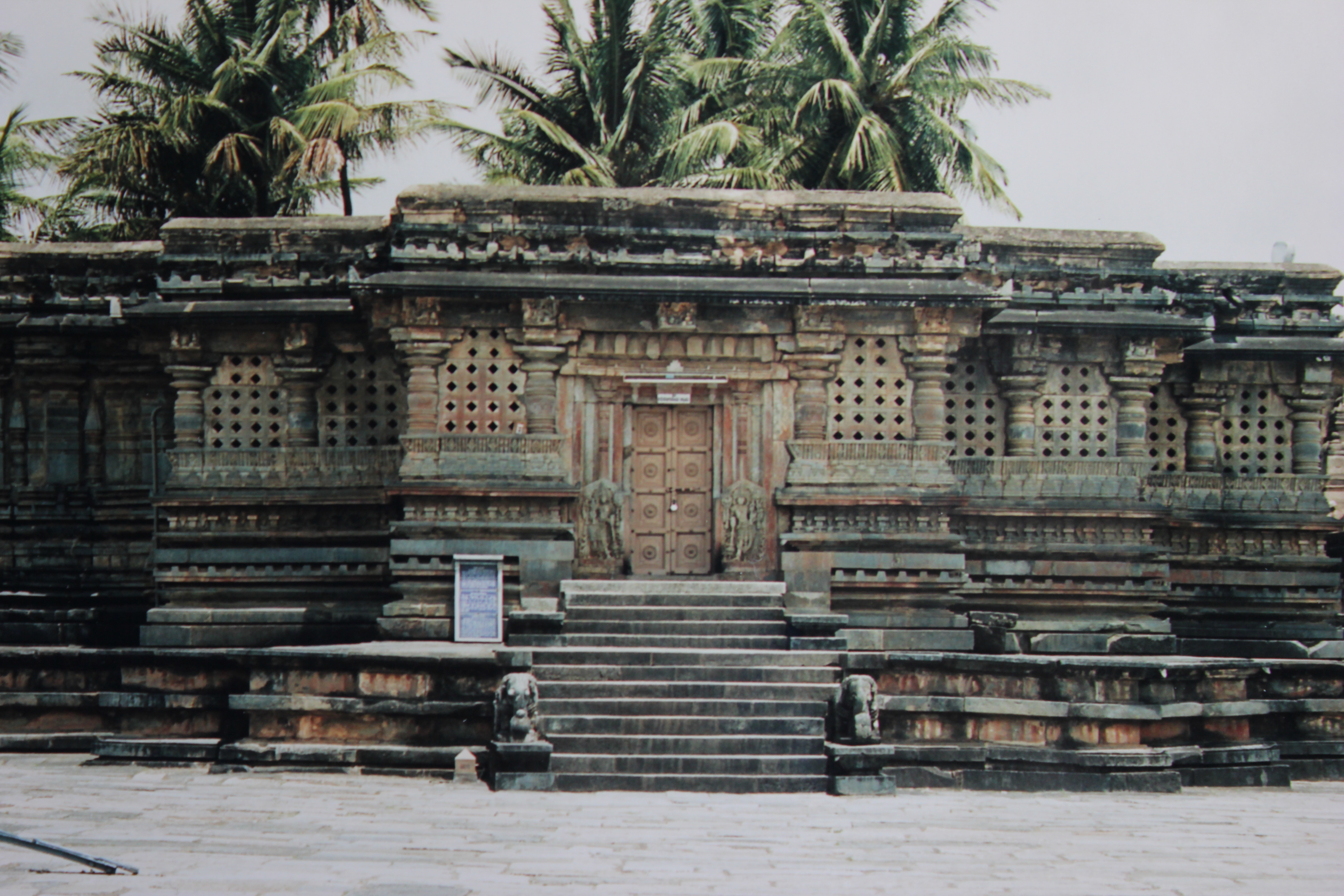
Kappe Chennigaraya Temple built by queen Shantala Devi

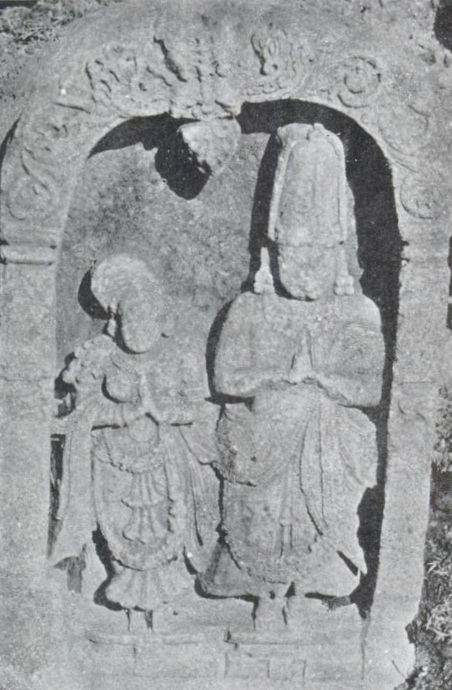
Relief of King Vishnuvardhana and queen Shantala Devi, in the Chennakeshava Temple at Belur.

Vishnuvardhana or Bittideva (r. 1108–1152) was a king of the Hoysala Empire in what is today the state of Karnataka, India. He ascended the Hoysala throne after the death of his elder brother Veera Ballala I in 1108. Originally a follower of Jainism and known as Bitti-deva, he is particularly remembered for his military campaigns against the Cholas, who were responsible for the destruction of Jain Basadis (Jain temple complexes) around Talakadu. He led the counter against the Chola's general Adiyamma near Talakadu and recovered lost territory. After this victory the King earned the title "Talakadugonda" and made significant land grants to Jain Basadis at Shravanbelgola and Kambadahalli. According to historian Coelho, the Hoysalas gained the dignity of the kingdom due to the efforts of Vishnuvardhana, whose rule was filled with "glorious" military campaigns. According to historians Sen, Chopra and Sastri, Vishnuvardhana was a "great soldier" and an "ambitious monarch". He later came under the influence of Ramanujacharya, and began supporting Vaishnavism. Ramanujacharya gave him the name "Vishnuvardhana". His queen Shantala Devi and his family however remained devotees of Jainism.

Several Kannada poets flourished during the rule of Vishnuvardhana. The mathematician Rajaditya wrote Vyavaharaganita, "Lilavati" on mathematics. According to the historian E.P. Rice, the epic poet Nagachandra under Vishnuvardhana's patronage wrote the earliest extant Jain version of the Ramayana in the Kannada language called Ramachandra charita purana, and an epic on the nineteenth Jain Tirthankar titled Mallinathapurana.

== Conquests ==
Vishnuvardhana was the governor over parts of Gangavadi during the rule of his elder brother Veera Ballala I. After ascending the Hoysala throne, his first major conquest was that of the occupied Chola territories of Gangavadi. According to the historian Kamath, the disgruntled Chola governor Adigaiman may have helped Vishnuvardhana in his conquest. Being a Vaishnava Hindu by faith, the Chola governor may not have been treated well by King Kulothunga Chola I. But Sastri claims Vishnuvardhana overwhelmed Adigaiman before gaining his support. By c.1117, Vishnuvardhana defeated the other rulers of the Nilgiri region, such as the Chengalvas, the Kongalvas (resulting in his marriage to the Kongalva princess Chandaladevi, according to the historian Derrett), and the Nidugal Chola ruler Irukkavela. According to Kamath, Vishnuvardhana's forces marched as far as Kanchi. The Nolambas of Nolambavadi, Kadambas of Banavasi and Goa (ruled by Jayakesi II), the Pandyas of Uchchangi (a small dynasty of rulers near the Tungabhadra), the Alupas of Mangaluru, and the Santaras of Hosagunda had to pay tribute and accepted Vishnuvardhana as their overlord. Hoysala inscriptions of the period note Vishnuvardhana's conquest of the Nilgiris. The Chamarajanagara inscription gives details that his armies crossed the Nila mountains and proclaims him the "master of Kerala". According to the historians Chopra, Ravindran and Subhramanian, other records mention his temporary stay in Kanchi after his victories over the Cholas. Vishnuvardhana was responsible in part for the disruption to the Chola Empire. With these victories, Vishnuvardhana assumed the titles Talakadugonda ("Lord of Talakad") and Nolambavadi gonda ("Lord of the Nolambas").

=== Wars against the Kalyani Chalukyas ===
After his successes in the south, Vishnuvardhana swiftly turned north with the intention of breaking free from his overlord, the great Western Chalukya King Vikramaditya VI. Between c.1117 and c.1120, Vishnuvardhana successfully dealt with the Chalukyan armies at Kannegala (c.1118), occupied a strategic fort at Hanagal, defeated the Chalukyan commander Boppanna at Hallur (c.1120) and spread his control over the Banavasi and Humacha regions. By c.1122, he had reached the Krishna River. Here he was defeated by the powerful Sinda chief Achugi, a commander loyal to the Chalukya emperor. Vishnuvardhana thus had to accept, for the time being, subordination to the Chalukya throne. But he was not to be subdued for long. After the death of Vikarmaditya VI, the Hoysala monarch re-captured Hanagal, Uchchangi and Bankapura by c.1140 and marched north of the Tungabhadra River up to Lakkundi. The historian Majumdar claims Vishnuvardhana controlled areas in the Krishna river region even around c.1131 and performed the prestigious Tulapurusha ceremony, a symbol of sovereignty, despite his nominal subordination to the Chalukyas. Historians are divided over the year when Vishnuvardhana died. Sastri, S.K. Aiyangar and Desai are of the opinion he died in c.1152. But Kamath claims there is evidence the Vishnuvardhana died a little earlier because the Yalladahalli record of c.1145 proclaims his son Narasimha I the Hoysala monarch.

== Architectural legacy ==
Vishnuvardhana was a great builder. To celebrate his success against the Cholas, he built the Jain Basadis at Kambadahalli and Shravanbelgola and several Hindu temples in his Kingdom, and the spectacular Chennakesava Temple at Belur (also called the Vijayanarayana temple), dedicated to the Hindu god Vishnu. Around the same time, the Hoysaleswara Temple, more ornate than the one at Belur and dedicated to the Hindu god Shiva was consecrated. These two temples of Belur and Halebidu, and the Keshava temple at Somanathapura (built by Hoysala king Narsimha III) were accorded UNESCO World Heritage Site status. Within the Chennakesava temple complex is the smaller yet ornate Kappe Chennigaraya temple built by Vishnuvardhana's noted queen Shantaladevi. The Vithoba Temple in Pandharpur, Maharashtra was also built by him.

Preceded by Veera Ballala I	Hoysala; 1108–1152	Succeeded by Narasimha I
