= 1299 =

1299 in various calendars
- Gregorian calendar: 1299; MCCXCIX
- Ab urbe condita: 2052
- Armenian calendar: 748; ԹՎ ՉԽԸ
- Assyrian calendar: 6049
- Balinese saka calendar: 1220–1221
- Bengali calendar: 705–706
- Berber calendar: 2249
- English Regnal year: 27 Edw. 1 – 28 Edw. 1
- Buddhist calendar: 1843
- Burmese calendar: 661
- Byzantine calendar: 6807–6808
- Chinese calendar: 戊戌年 (Earth Dog); 3996 or 3789 — to — 己亥年 (Earth Pig); 3997 or 3790
- Coptic calendar: 1015–1016
- Discordian calendar: 2465
- Ethiopian calendar: 1291–1292
- Hebrew calendar: 5059–5060
- Hindu calendars
- Vikram Samvat: 1355–1356
- Shaka Samvat: 1220–1221
- Kali Yuga: 4399–4400
- Holocene calendar: 11299
- Igbo calendar: 299–300
- Iranian calendar: 677–678
- Islamic calendar: 698–699
- Japanese calendar: Einin 7 / Shōan 1 (正安元年)
- Javanese calendar: 1210–1211
- Julian calendar: 1299; MCCXCIX
- Korean calendar: 3632
- Minguo calendar: 613 before ROC 民前613年
- Nanakshahi calendar: −169
- Thai solar calendar: 1841–1842
- Tibetan calendar: ས་ཕོ་ཁྱི་ལོ་ (male Earth-Dog); 1425 or 1044 or 272 — to — ས་མོ་ཕག་ལོ་ (female Earth-Boar); 1426 or 1045 or 273

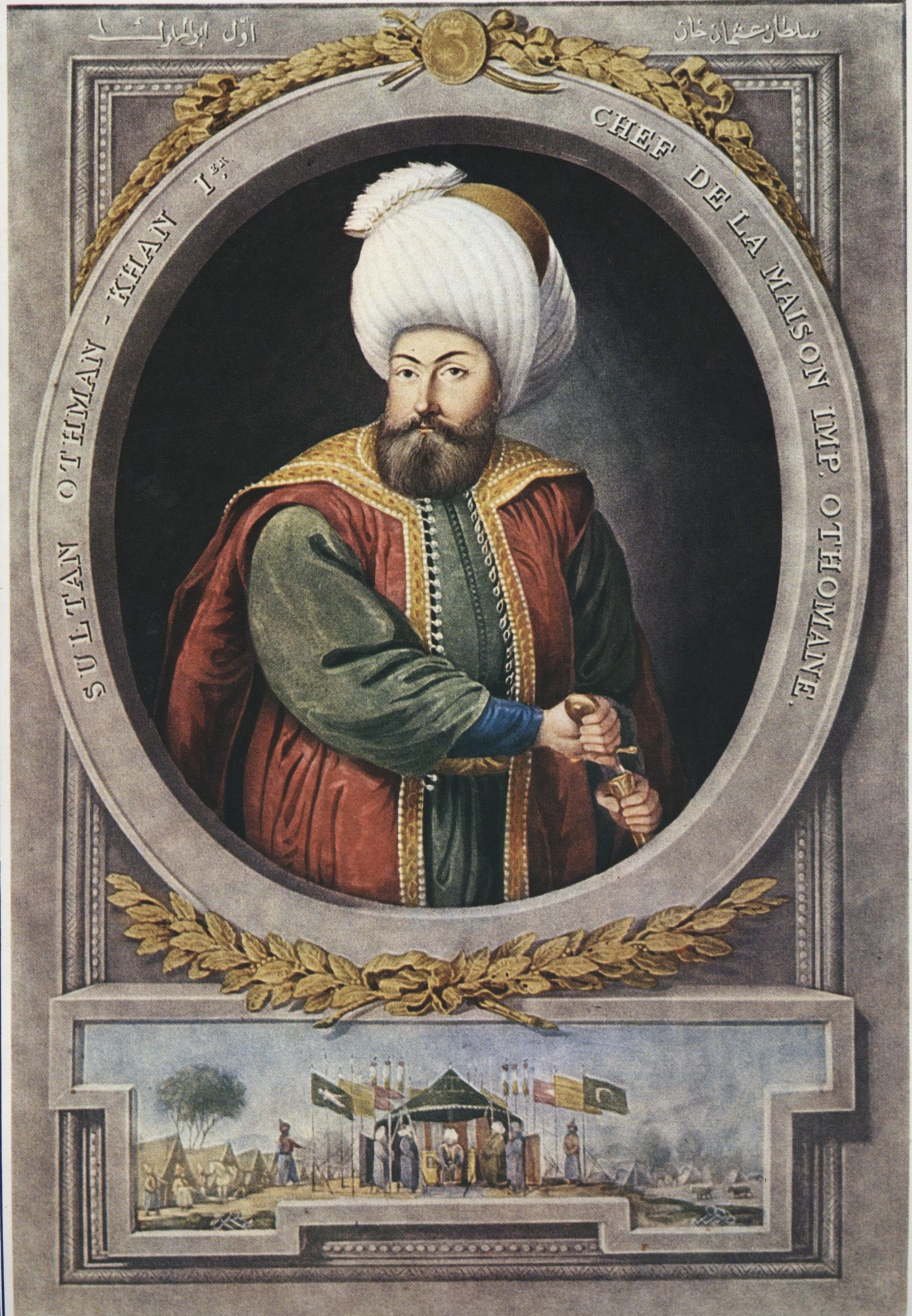
Sultan Osman I (r. 1299–1324)

Mongol invasions of the Levant (1299–1303). Battle of Wadi al-Khaznadar is located at 3rd Homs (Homs), in Syria.

Year 1299 (MCCXCIX) was a common year starting on Thursday of the Julian calendar.

== Events ==
=== By place ===
==== Europe ====
- July 4 – Battle of Cape Orlando: An Aragonese-Angevin fleet (some 60 galleys) led by Admiral Roger of Lauria defeats a Sicilian fleet near Sicily. During the battle, the larger Aragonese fleet is trapped on a lee shore, but can exploit the situation with the intervention of its 6 reserve galleys. The Sicilians flee when the flagship, with King Frederick III of Sicily on board, pulls back after he collapses from heat exhaustion. Lauria captures 18 Sicilian ships, and orders the massacre of their crews to avenge the death of his nephew at the hands of Frederick.
- July 31 – Pisa and Genoa agree to a thirty-year truce. Part of the treaty includes the end of the Pisan military support to Genoa's enemies in Corsica.
- November 10 – John I, count of Holland, dies and is succeeded by his uncle John II. He establishes a personal union with the County of Hainaut.
- December 1 – Battle of Falconaria: Sicilian forces under King Frederick II defeat Philip I of Taranto. During the battle, Philip is taken prisoner.

==== British Isles ====
- September 8 – Edward I of England ("Longshanks") marries the 19-year-old Margaret of France, the half-sister of King Philip IV ("the Fair").
- William Wallace accompanied by a Scottish retinue goes abroad to France on a diplomatic mission, evidently to canvas support for the kingship of John Balliol.
- Southampton Old Bowling Green is established in Southampton. It is the oldest surviving bowling green.

==== Levant ====
- December – Mongol forces (some 10,000 men) led by Ghazan Khan cross the Euphrates River and invade Syria. They continue south, and successfully take Aleppo. There, Ghazan is joined by forces from his vassal state of Cilician Armenia. King Hethum II leads the Armenian army (which includes Templar and Hospitaller knights). He participates during the Mongol offensive and regains all the Armenian territories which have previously been lost to the Mamluks.
- December 22–23 – Battle of Wadi al-Khaznadar: Mongol forces under Ghazan Khan defeat a Mamluk army (some 30,000 men) north of Homs. Sultan Al-Nasir Muhammad flees with the remnants of his army to Damascus. Ghazan splits his forces, one part sacks Damascus and besieges the citadel. Another part pursues the retreating Mamluks as far as Gaza, pushing them back to Egypt.

==== Asia ====
- Spring – Mongol invasion of India: Duwa Khan, Mongol ruler of the Chagatai Khanate, sends his sons Qutlugh Khwaja and Duwa Temür with an army of some 50,000 horsemen over the border. The Mongols bypass villages to maximize speed, intending to strike directly at Delhi itself. At the Jumna River, Mongol forces under Qutlugh defeated Zafar Khan, and are forced to retreat to Delhi. News of the defeat causes thousands to abandon their homes, the capital is soon flooded with refugees. The streets, the markets and the mosques become overcrowded. Meanwhile, the merchant caravans headed for Delhi are interrupted by the Mongols.
- February 25 – Sultan Alauddin Khalji orders the army (some 35,000 men) to prepare for the march to Gujarat. One part of the army under Nusrat Khan starts its march from Delhi. Another part, led by Ulugh Khan, marches from Sindh and attacks Jaisalmer along the way. When the army returns from raiding Gujarat, Mongol soldiers stage a mutiny over payment of khums (one-fifth of the share of loot). The mutiny is crushed, the mutineer families in Delhi are punished and executed.
- Mongol invasion of India: Battle of Kili: Alauddin Khalji raises forces (some 70,000 men with 700 elephants) and attacks the Mongols under Qutlugh Khwaja north of Delhi. Zafar Khan, looking to avenge his defeat on the River Jumna, leads the first charge, attacking the Mongol left flank, which breaks before him. Zafar gives chase to drive them from the field – but he is ambushed by a feigned retreat. He is captured and executed with all his men. Qutlugh is wounded in battle and dies during the return journey.
- May 10 – King Kyawswa of Pagan and his son, Crown Prince Theingapati, are executed at Myinsaing, by the three brothers of the Myinsaing Kingdom (nominally Kyawswa's viceroys), for submitting and being a vassal to the Mongol-led Yuan dynasty (since 1297).
- July 27 – Osman I (or Othman) declares the Anatolian beylik (principality) to be independent of the Seljuk Sultanate of Rum, originating the Ottoman Empire. Osman becomes the founder and the first ruler, with Söğüt as the capital, which will last until the 1920s.
- The Kingdom of Singapura is founded by Sang Nila Utama, a Srivijaya prince. Upon his coronation, he adopts the official title Sri Tri Buana (translated as "Lord of Three Worlds").

=== By topic ===
==== Cities and towns ====
- April 1 – Kingston upon Hull is granted city status in England by royal charter of Edward I.

==== Literature ====
- Approximate date – Rustichello da Pisa completes taking down The Travels of Marco Polo from Marco while they are both imprisoned in Genoa.

==== Markets ====
- King Edward I of England is recorded as borrowing from Italian merchants. He obtains a loan of 2,000 pollard marks, from agents of the Frescobaldi Firm in London.

==== Religion ====
- June 27 – Pope Boniface VIII issues the papal bull "Scimus, Fili" condemning Edward I of England's invasion and occupation of Scotland.

==== Science and technology ====
- The spinning wheel is now in widespread use in England for manufacturing woolen yarn.

== Births ==
- May 15 – Henry the Friendly, German nobleman and knight (d. 1327)
- June 24 – John de Verdon, English nobleman and knight (d. 1376)
- August 15 – Ralph de Greystoke, English landowner (d. 1323)
- November 1 – Elizabeth de Comyn, English noblewoman (d. 1372)
- November 2 – Alfonso IV ("the Gentle"), king of Aragon (d. 1336)
- unknown dates
  - Akashi Kakuichi, Japanese Buddhist monk and musician (d. 1371)
  - Dmitry of Tver, Russian nobleman and Grand Prince (d. 1326)
  - Galeotto I Malatesta, Italian nobleman and knight (condottiero) (d. 1385)
  - Henry II, Landgrave of Hesse ("the Iron"), German nobleman and regent (d. 1376)

== Deaths ==
- January 16 – Lajin, Egyptian ruler of the Mamluk Sultanate
- April 10 – Malik ibn al-Murahhal, Moroccan poet (b. 1207)
- May 10
  - Kyawswa, Burmese ruler of the Pagan Kingdom (b. 1260)
  - Theingapati, Burmese prince and heir (Pagan Kingdom)
- May 17 – Daumantas of Pskov, Lithuanian prince (b. 1240)
- July 15 – Eric II (Magnusson), king of Norway (b. 1268)
- August 1
  - Conrad of Lichtenberg, German bishop (b. 1240)
  - Wolfert I van Borselen, Dutch nobleman and regent
- August 15 – Henry of Newark, English clerk and archbishop
- September 23 – Nicolas de Nonancourt, French chancellor
- October 8 – Jakuen, Japanese disciple and scholar (b. 1207)
- October 12 – John II, German nobleman, knight and regent
- November 10 – John I of Holland, Dutch nobleman (b. 1284)
- November 19 – Mechtilde, German noblewoman and mystic
- December 9 – Bohemond I, German knight and archbishop
- December 31
  - Margaret of Anjou, French noblewoman (b. 1272)
  - Ralph Basset, English nobleman and governor
