= Mongol invasion of Sindh =

1290s campaign in India

Siege of Sivistan 1298–1299
- Part of Mongol invasions of India
Date	1298–1299
Location	Sivistan, Sindh 26.4234157°N 67.8629399°E
Result	Delhi-Soomra victory
Territorial changes	Mongol forces expelled from Sivistan

Belligerents
Mongols, possibly Neguderi fugitives	Delhi Sultanate; Soomra dynasty

Commanders and leaders
Saldi (executed)	Zafar Khan; Chanesar II

Casualties and losses
Heavy	Unknown
- Location of Sivistan (Sehwan) in present-day Pakistan

In 1298–99, a Mongol army (possibly Neguderi fugitives) invaded the Sindh region of the Delhi Sultanate, and occupied the fort of Sivistan in present-day Pakistan. The Delhi Sultan Alauddin Khalji dispatched his general Zafar Khan to evict the Mongols. Zafar Khan recaptured the fort, and imprisoned the Mongol leader Saldi and his companions.

== Mongol invasion ==
The Mongol Chagatai Khanate had invaded the Delhi Sultanate a number of times. In February 1298, a Delhi army led by Alauddin Khalji's general Ulugh Khan inflicted a crushing defeat on the Mongols.

Sometime later, a Mongol force invaded the Sindh region located on the western frontier of the Delhi Sultanate. The invaders occupied the fort of Sivistan (also called Siwistan or Sibi). This place can be identified with the north-western part of Sindh (around modern Sehwan).

The invasion seems to have happened in 1298–99. According to the 17th-century chronicle Zafar-al-Walih, the Mongols occupied the Sivistan fort in 697 AH, and the Delhi forces recaptured it in 698 AH.

The 14th-century chronicler Ziauddin Barani states that the invasion was led by Saldi (or Soldi) and his brother. Historian Peter Jackson believes that "Saldi" is the Indian transcription of the Mongol name "Sogedei" (or "Sogetei"). The 14th-century chronicler Isami describes Saldi as a Turk and his associate as a "Baluch". Based on this, Jackson theorizes that Sogedei's forces were fugitives from the Neguderi territory in present-day Afghanistan.

The 16th-century historian Firishta claims that the invasion was led by Duwa (the ruler of the Chagatai Khanate) and his brother Chaldi (Saldi). However, this is obviously incorrect: Firishta states that after their defeat, Saldi and his brother were imprisoned and brought to Delhi. On the other hand, Duwa was a powerful ruler who remained in power until 1306–07.

== Sultanates' response ==
Jam Chanesar, a Soomra ruler of southern Sindh during Alauddin Khalji’s reign, diplomatically submitted to the Khilji Sultanate, offering tribute and a marriage alliance with Alauddin’s brother, Ulugh Khan. This alliance ensured Sindh’s loyalty, preventing collaboration with the Mongols who occupied Sivistan in 1298–1299. Chanesar’s submission stabilized the region, allowing Alauddin to focus on repelling the Mongols without deploying forces to southern Sindh. No evidence suggests Chanesar’s direct military involvement.

In 1298–99, a large part of Alauddin's army had marched to Gujarat, led by Ulugh Khan and Nusrat Khan. In absence of these reputed generals, Alauddin dispatched Zafar Khan, the governor of Samana, to evict the Mongols from Sivistan. Despite a barrage of arrows from the Mongols and despite not making use of any siege engines, Zafar Khan's army entered the fort.

According to the Delhi courtier Amir Khusrau, Zafar Khan reclaimed the fort in heavy battles involving melee combats using short ranged weapons like axes, swords, javelins, and spears. He carried out this siege without using standard military equipments of siege warfare such as manjaniq or ballistas (aradah or irada). He did not even resort to mines, wooden siege towers (gargaj) or earthwork battlement mounds (pashib).

== Aftermath ==
Saldi, his brother and other Mongols (both male and female) were arrested and brought to Delhi in chains. No chroniclers state what happened to them, but it is likely that Alauddin ordered them to be killed.

The victory established Zafar Khan's reputation as a brilliant general. According to the chronicler Ziauddin Barani, Zafar Khan's success made both Alauddin and his brother Ulugh Khan jealous. Barani further states that they made plans to blind or poison Zafar Khan. Historian Banarsi Prasad Saksena doubts the truthfulness of Barani's allegations.

Alauddin's courtier Amir Khusrau does not mention this conflict in his writings. Alauddin perceived Zafar Khan's actions in the subsequent Battle of Kili (1299) as reckless and a sign of disobedience: therefore, Zafar Khan's name was omitted in the royal chronicles. However, later chroniclers such as Ziauddin Barani, Isami and Firishta have described it.
