= Zafar Khan =

Zafar Khan may refer to:

- Zafar Khan (Delhi Sultanate) (died 1299), general of the Delhi Sultanate
- Zafar Khan (Afghan general) (born 1953), general of the Afghan National Army
- Zafar Khan (businessman) (born 1968), British businessman
- Zafar Muhammad Khan (died 1971), Pakistani naval officer
- Ala-ud-Din Bahman Shah (died 1358), born Zafar Khan, founder of the Bahmani Sultanate
- Muzaffar Shah I (died 1411), born Zafar Khan, founder of the Gujarat Sultanate

== See also ==
- Zafar Khan Malik Dinar, Indian slave general of Delhi Sultanate
- Zafar Khan Ghazi Mosque and Dargah, monument in West Bengal, India
