= Zafar Khan (Delhi Sultanate) =

General of Alauddin Khalji (13th century)

- Died: 1299; Kili near Delhi
- Children: Diler Khan
- Military career
- Allegiance: Delhi Sultanate
- Branch: Khalji dynasty, Ariz-i-Mumalik
- Service years: 1296–1299
- Conflicts: Siege of Multan; Battle of Jaran Manjur; Siege of Sivistan; Battle of Kili †

Hizabruddin, better known by his title Zafar Khan, was a general of the Delhi Sultanate ruler Alauddin Khalji. He held charge of Multan, Samana, and Sivistan at various times during Alauddin's reign.

Associated with Alauddin since the latter's days as a governor of Kara, Zafar Khan led a major division of Alauddin's army from Kara to Delhi after Alauddin assassinated his predecessor Jalaluddin in 1296. Along with Alauddin's brother Ulugh Khan, he led the army that invaded Multan to eliminate the surviving members of Jalaluddin's family.

Zafar Khan, along with Ulugh Khan, probably led the Delhi army that inflicted a crushing defeat on the Chagatai Mongol invaders at Jaran Manjur in 1298. Later that year, Alauddin dispatched Zafar Khan to recapture Sivistan, which had been occupied by Mongol invaders. Zafar Khan decisively defeated the invaders and took their leader to Delhi as a prisoner. In 1299, he was killed in the Battle of Kili against the Mongol invaders led by Qutlugh Khwaja. Before being killed in action, he inflicted heavy casualties on the Mongols, which was an important factor in the subsequent Mongol retreat. However, his legacy was not recognized in the Sultanate's chronicles, as he had disobeyed Alauddin by recklessly attacking the Mongols during the battle, ignoring the order to hold his position until Alauddin's instruction.

== Early career ==
Little is known about the early life of Hizabruddin Zafar Khan. He was of Turk origin. The 15th century chronicler, Yahya bin Ahmad Sirhindi, says that his original name was Yusuf, and also that he was a son of a sister of Alauddin. The 16th century chronicler ʽAbd al-Qadir Badayuni) calls him Badruddin instead of Hizabruddin.

Zafar Khan led Alauddin's forces even before Alauddin became the Sultan of Delhi. After Alauddin assassinated his predecessor Jalaluddin at Kara, Zafar Khan led one of Alauddin's two contingents that marched to Delhi. The first contingent was headed by Alauddin and Nusrat Khan; Zafar Khan headed the second contingent that arrived in Delhi via Koil (modern Aligarh).

After taking control of the throne in Delhi, Alaudidn appointed Zafar Khan as Ariz-i-Mumalik (Minister of War).

== Siege of Multan ==
After establishing his power in Delhi, Alauddin decided to eliminate Jalaluddin's surviving family members, who were in Multan. In November 1296, he sent a 30,000-40,000-strong army led by his brother Ulugh Khan and Zafar Khan to conquer Multan. The defending forces, facing a certain defeat, surrendered after a short siege. Zafar Khan was later given charge of Multan.

== Battle of Jaran Manjur ==
In the winter of 1297–1298, Duwa, the ruler of the Mongol Chagatai Khanate, sent an expedition to the Delhi Sultanate. The army, led by his noyan Kadar, ransacked the Punjab region, advancing up to Kasur. According to Ziauddin Barani, Alauddin dispatched Ulugh Khan and Zafar Khan to check the Mongol invasion. Alauddin's courtier Amir Khusrau omits Zafar Khan's name, but Barani is probably correct. (Zafar Khan's name was omitted in the dynasty's official chronicles because Alauddin was unhappy with his reckless disobedience during the Battle of Kili).

The Delhi army decisively defeated Mongols with on 6 February 1298 at Jaran-Manjur, a place located on the banks of the Sutlej River. According to Khusrau, 20,000 Mongols were killed in the battle.

== Siege of Sivistan ==
Zafar Khan subsequently served as Alauddin's governor of Samana in the Punjab region. In 1298–1299, a Mongol army (possibly Qara'unas fugitives) led by Saldi invaded the Sindh region, and occupied the fort of Sivistan. At this time, a large part of Alauddin's army had marched to Gujarat under Ulugh Khan and Nusrat Khan. In their absence, Alauddin dispatched Zafar Khan to recapture Sivistan. Despite a barrage of arrows from the Mongols and despite not making use of any siege engines, Zafar Khan's army captured the fort using short ranged weapons like axes, swords, javelins, and spears. Zafar Khan took Saldi and other Mongols to Delhi as prisoners. He was given charge of Sivistan.

The victory established Zafar Khan's reputation as a brilliant general. According to the chronicler Ziauddin Barani, Alauddin once thought of establishing a new religion just like Muhammad had established Islam. He compared his four brave and loyal generals (Alp Khan, Nusrat Khan, Ulugh Khan, and Zafar Khan) to Muhammad's Rashidun companions Abu Bakr, Umar, Uthman, and Ali. Barani also states that Zafar Khan's success at Sivistan made both Alauddin and his brother Ulugh Khan jealous. According to Barani, Alauddin thought of sending Zafar Khan away from Delhi, by ordering him to conquer and govern Bengal. Barani also claims that Alauddin and Ulugh Khan made plans to blind or poison Zafar Khan. Historian Banarsi Prasad Saxena doubts the truthfulness of Barani's allegations.

== Death at the Battle of Kili ==
In 1299, a Mongol army from Chagatai Khanate, led by prince Qutlugh Khwaja, invaded the Delhi Sultanate. As the governor of Samana, Zafar Khan challenged them to a battle as they passed through Punjab, but Qutlugh Khwaja refused the offer, declaring that "kings only fight kings". He asked Zafar to fight under the banner of his master Alauddin at Delhi.

The Mongols encamped at Kili near Delhi, and Alauddin personally led a force against the invaders. Zafar Khan was given charge of the Delhi army's right wing, which was supported by Hindu warriors. He was one of the five lead commanders of the Delhi army; the other four being Alauddin, Nusrat Khan, Akat Khan, and Ulugh Khan.

Alauddin's strategy was to delay the battle, as he was expecting reinforcements to arrive from his provincial armies, and hoped that scarcity of provisions would ultimately force the Mongols to retreat. He asked his generals not to make a move without his orders, but Zafar Khan disregarded these instructions, and attacked one of the Mongol contingents. The Mongols feigned retreat, tricking Zafar Khan and his cavalry into following them to an isolated location. After covering approximately 55 kilometers, Zafar Khan realized that his infantry had been left behind, and he had only 1,000 horsemen left with him. Another Mongol contingent blocked his return to the Delhi camp.

Finding themselves in a tough situation, Zafar Khan and his companions determined that a return to the Delhi camp was not possible, and even if it happened, Alauddin would punish them for disobedience and cowardice. Therefore, they decided to die fighting. According to Ziauddin Barani's Tarikh-i-Firuz Shahi, Qutlugh Khwaja offered Zafar Khan an opportunity to surrender, promising to give him a bigger position at the Chagatai court than the one he held at the Delhi court. But Zafar Khan refused this offer.

According to the 14th century chronicler Isami, Zafar Khan and his companions managed to kill 5,000 Mongols, while losing only 800 men. After this, Zafar Khan put up a last stand with his 200 surviving soldiers. After his horse was cut down, he fought on foot, and engaged in a hand-to-hand combat with the Mongol commander Hijlak. He was killed by an arrow that bypassed his armour and pierced his heart.

The Mongols ultimately decided to retreat after two days, without any further action on the battlefield. Barani states that the Mongols retreated because of the terror that Zafar Khan's attack had caused among them. According to him, whenever their horses refused to drink water, the Mongols would ask them if they had seen Zafar Khan. The actual reason for the Mongol retreat seems to be that Qutlugh Khwaja was seriously wounded in action.

== Legacy ==
Although Zafar Khan was killed in action, Alauddin resented the fact that he had disobeyed the royal orders. Nobody in the Delhi court praised Zafar Khan's gallantry; on the contrary, Alauddin denounced his recklessness and disobedience.

Zafar Khan's name was omitted in the subsequent royal chronicles written during Alauddin's reign. For example, Amir Khusrau's Khazainul Futuh makes no mention of him. While describing the military victories accomplished during Alauddin's reign, Khusrau completely omits the Siege of Sivistan which established Zafar Khan's reputation as a general. However, the battle is mentioned by the later chroniclers such as Ziauddin Barani, Isami and Firishta.

In 1301, when Alauddin was at Ranthambore, a group of Zafar Khan's followers helped his officer Malik Hamiduddin suppress Haji Maula's rebellion in Delhi. After Alauddin's death, his son Qutb ud din Mubarak Shah bestowed Zafar Khan's title on Malik Dinar, who had earlier served as the Sultanate's master of the elephants (Shihna-yi pil).
