= India–Mongolia relations =

- India: Mongolia

Diplomatic mission
- Embassy of India, Ulaanbaatar: Embassy of Mongolia, New Delhi

Envoy
- Indian Ambassador to Mongolia H.E Mr Atul Malhari Gotsurve: Mongolian Ambassador to India; Ganbold Dambajav

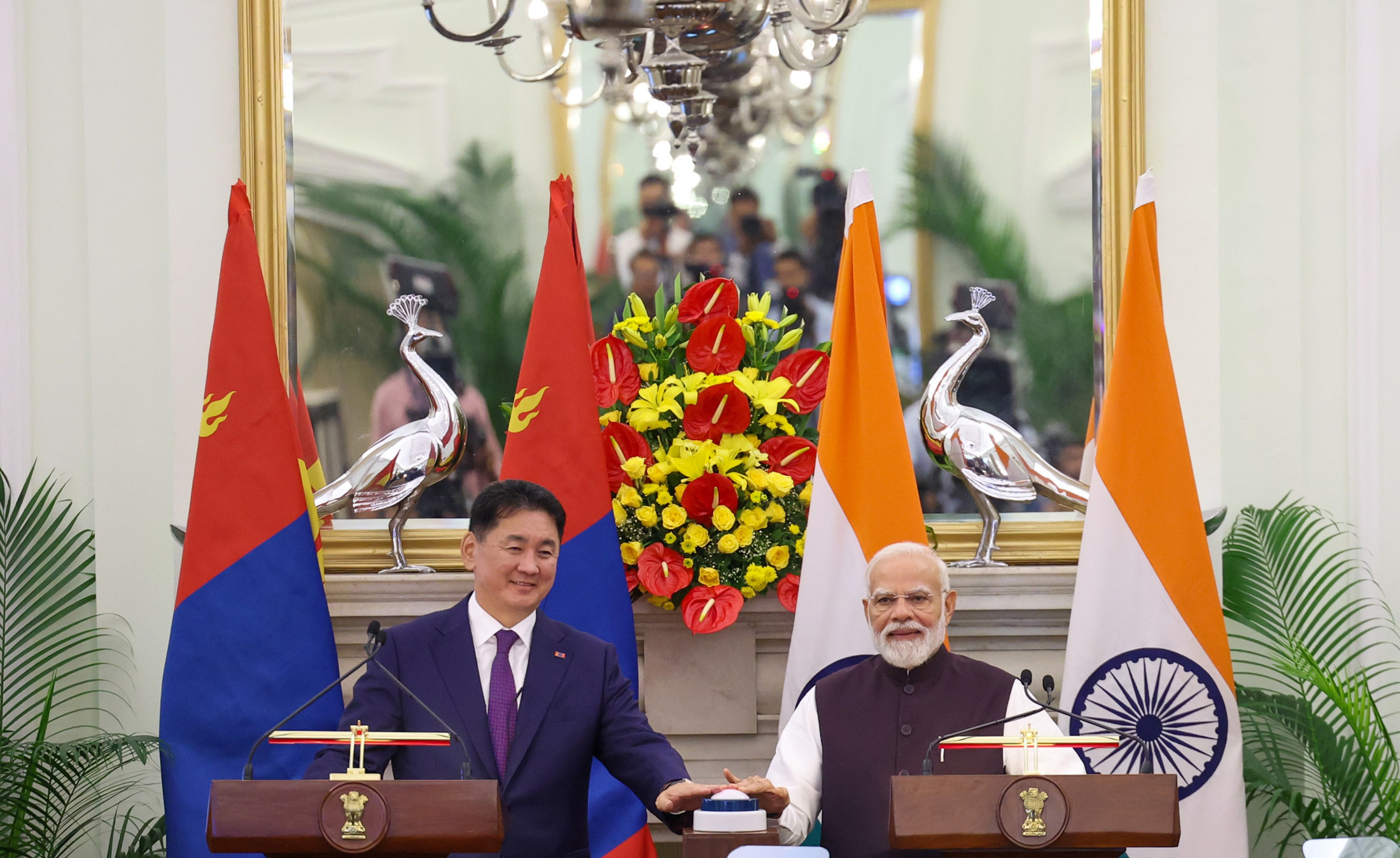
PM Narendra Modi and the President of Mongolia, Khurelsukh Ukhnaa witnessing the Exchange of MoUs between India and Mongolia.

India–Mongolia relations, also known as Indo-Mongolian relations, are the bilateral relations between the Republic of India and Mongolia. These relations are rapidly developing, with Indo-Mongolian cooperation formerly limited to diplomatic visits, provision of soft loans and financial aid and the collaborations in the IT sector; but were enhanced in 2015 by Narendra Modi's visit to Ulaanbaatar, where the two Prime Ministers declared a "strategic partnership" between the two Asian democracies.

India established diplomatic relations in December 1955. India was the first country outside the Eastern Bloc to establish diplomatic relations with Mongolia. Since then, there have been treaties of mutual friendship and cooperation between the two countries in 1973, 1994, 2001 and 2004.

Mongolia supports India's candidature as a permanent member of the United Nations Security Council, while India supported the inclusion of Mongolia as a full member of the Non-Aligned Movement.

According to a 2010 Gallup poll, 26% of Mongolians approve of Indian leadership, with 9% disapproving and 66% uncertain.

In December 2016, Mongolia asked for financial help from India after the country's border with China was blocked.

Following Indian External affairs minister Sushma Swaraj's visit to Mongolia in April 2018, India & Mongolia decided to establish an air-corridor to boost bilateral trade. It is also expected that construction of Mongolia's first ever oil refinery will commence in 2023 with technical & financial assistance from Megha Engineering & Infrastructures Limited (MEIL).

== Historical relations ==
There has been historical interaction between India and Mongolia for over 2,700 years.

=== Delhi Sultanate ===
During the Delhi Sultanate, the Turco-Mongol conqueror in Central Asia, Timur (Tamerlane), attacked the reigning Sultan Nasir-u Din Mehmud of the Tughlaq dynasty in the north Indian city of Delhi. The Sultan's army was defeated on 17 December 1398. Timur entered Delhi and the city was sacked, destroyed, and left in ruins, after Timur's army had killed and plundered for three days and nights. He ordered the whole city to be sacked except for the sayyids, scholars, and the other Muslims; 100,000 war prisoners were put to death in one day.

=== Mughal Empire ===
In 1526, Babur, an alleged Timurid descendant of Timur and Genghis Khan from Fergana Valley (modern day Uzbekistan), swept across the Khyber Pass and established the Mughal Empire, covering modern day Afghanistan, Pakistan, India and Bangladesh. However, his son Humayun was defeated by the Afghan warrior Sher Shah Suri in the year 1540, and Humayun was forced to retreat to Kabul. After Sher Shah's death, his son Islam Shah Suri and the Hindu king Hemu, who had won 22 battles against Afghan rebels and forces of Akbar, from Punjab to Bengal and had established a Muslim rule in North India from Delhi until 1556. Akbar's forces defeated and killed Hemu in the Second Battle of Panipat on 6 November 1556.

The Mughal dynasty ruled most of the Indian subcontinent by 1600; it went into a slow decline after 1707. The Mughals suffered a severe blow due to native resistance from Marathas and invasions from Afghans due to which the Mughal dynasty were reduced to puppet rulers by 1757. The remnants of the Mughal dynasty were finally defeated and taken over by the British during the Indian Rebellion of 1857, also called the 1857 War of Independence. As the British took over the remnants of the Mughal Empire, the dynasty was ended.

The Mughals were perhaps the richest single dynasty to have ever existed. During the Mughal era, the dominant political forces consisted of the Mughal Empire and its tributaries and, later on, the rising successor states - including the Maratha Empire - which weakened Mughal dynasty. The Mughals, while often employing brutal tactics to subjugate their empire, had a policy of integration with Indian culture, which is what made them successful where the short-lived Sultanates of Delhi had failed. Akbar was not as fanatical. Akbar made few concessions declaring "Amari" or non-killing of animals in the holy days of Jainism. He rolled back the discriminative and intolerant jizya tax for non-Muslims. The Mughal emperors married local royalty, allied themselves with local maharajas, and attempted to fuse their Turko-Persian culture with ancient Indian styles, creating a unique Indo-Saracenic architecture. It was the erosion of this tradition marked with brutal religious persecution of Hindus and centralization that played a large part in the dynasty's downfall after Aurangzeb, who unlike previous emperors, re-imposed Jizya tax on non-Muslims in 1679, the destruction of sacred Hindu temples, such as the Vishwanath Temple in Kashi and the Keshava Dev Temple in Mathura.

=== Cultural exchanges ===
==== Buddhism ====
Buddhism was carried to Mongolia by Indian missionaries during the early Christian era. As a result, today, Buddhists form the single largest religious denomination in Mongolia.

Buddhists entered the service of Mongol Empire in the early 13th century. Buddhist monasteries established in Karakorum were granted tax exempt status, though the religion was not given official status by the Mongols until later. All variants of Buddhism, such as Chinese, Tibetan and Indian Buddhism flourished, though Tibetan Buddhism was eventually favored at the imperial level under emperor Möngke, who appointed Namo from Kashmir as chief of all Buddhist monks.

Ogedei's son and Guyuk's younger brother, Khoten, became the governor of Ningxia and Gansu. He launched a military campaign into Tibet under the command of Generals Lichi and Dhordha, and the marauding Mongols burned down Tibetan monuments such as the Reting monastery and the Gyal temple in 1240. Prince Kötön was convinced that no power in the world exceeded the might of the Mongols. However, he also believed that religion was necessary in the interests of the next life. Thus he invited Sakya Pandita to his ordo. Prince Kötön was impressed and healed by Sakya Pandita's teachings and knowledge, and later became the first known Buddhist prince of Mongol empire.

Kublai Khan, the founder of Yuan dynasty, also favored Buddhism. As early as the 1240s, he made contacts with a Chan Buddhist monk Haiyun, who became his Buddhist adviser. Kublai's second son, whom he later officially designated as his successor in the Yuan dynasty, was given a Chinese name "Zhenjin" (literally, "True Gold") by Haiyun. Khatun Chabi influenced Kublai to be converted to Buddhism, as she had received the Hévajra tantra initiations from Phagspa and been impressed. Kublai appointed Phagspa his state preceptor, and later imperial preceptor, giving him power over all the Buddhist monks within the territory of the Yuan dynasty. For the rest of the Yuan dynasty in Mongolia and China, until the Mongols were overthrown in 1368, Tibetan lamas were the most influential Buddhist clergy. Via the Tibetan clergy, Indian Buddhist textual tradition strongly influenced the religious life in the Empire.

Some of the Ilkhans in Iran held Paghmo gru-pa order as their appanage in Tibet and lavishly patronized a variety of Indian, Tibetan and Chinese Buddhist monks. But in 1295, Ghazan persecuted Buddhists and destroyed their temples. Before his conversion to Islam though, he had built a Buddhist temple in Khorasan. The 14th century Buddhist scriptures found at archaeological sites related to Chagatai Khanate show the popularity of Buddhism among the Mongols and the Uighurs. Tokhta of Golden Horde also encouraged lamas to settle in Russia, but his policy was halted by his Muslim successor Ozbeg Khan.

== Modern times ==
India established formal diplomatic relations with Mongolia on 24 December 1955, thereby becoming the first country outside the Soviet bloc to establish diplomatic relations with the country. Since then, there have been numerous diplomatic visits and interactions between the two countries. India sponsored Mongolia's candidacy for membership of the United Nations in 1961 despite opposition from Taiwan (Represented China at the UN before 1971) and in 1973, Mongolia reciprocated to the Indian gesture by becoming the second country after Bhutan to recognise Bangladesh as an independent country following the liberation of Bangladesh by Indian troops.

=== Joint Declaration of 1973 ===
An Indo-Mongolian joint declaration was signed in February 1973 during the Indian visit of the Mongolian Prime Minister Yumjaagiin Tsedenbal.

=== Treaty of Friendly Relations and Cooperation (1994) ===
A treaty of friendly relations and cooperation was signed in February 1994 during the visit of the then Mongolian president Punsalmaagiin Ochirbat, to India.

As per the provisions of the treaty, India and Mongolia resolved to develop cooperation in trade and economy, science, health, agriculture, culture, education, communication and tourism. They also resolved to work closely to ensure security and curbing international crimes and terrorism.

=== 2001–present ===
In January 2001, then-President Natsagiin Bagabandi visited India. During this visit, a Joint Declaration was issued and a series of six major agreements were signed in order to promote cooperation in the fields of Information Technology, Investment Promotion and Protection and mutual legal assistance in civil, criminal and commercial matters. Mongolia conveyed its support to India's bid to become a permanent member of the United Nations Security Council and also indicated its support for India's peace efforts with Pakistan.

The Mongolian prime Minister Nambaryn Enkhbayar visited India in January 2004. During this visit, three agreements were signed in order to promote mutual cooperation in the fields of Animal Health and Dairy, Space Science and biotechnology.

India offered a soft loan of US$25 million to improve its infrastructure. Proposals for an Atal Bihari Vajpayee Centre for Excellence in Information Technology and Communication Technology in the Mongolian capital Ulaanbaatar were formalized during this visit. The Foundation of IT Center was laid by Indian Prime Minister Narendra Modi on 17 May 2015. A Mongolian-run Buddhist monastery was established in the historic city of Bodh Gaya and its foundation stone was laid by Enkhbayar.

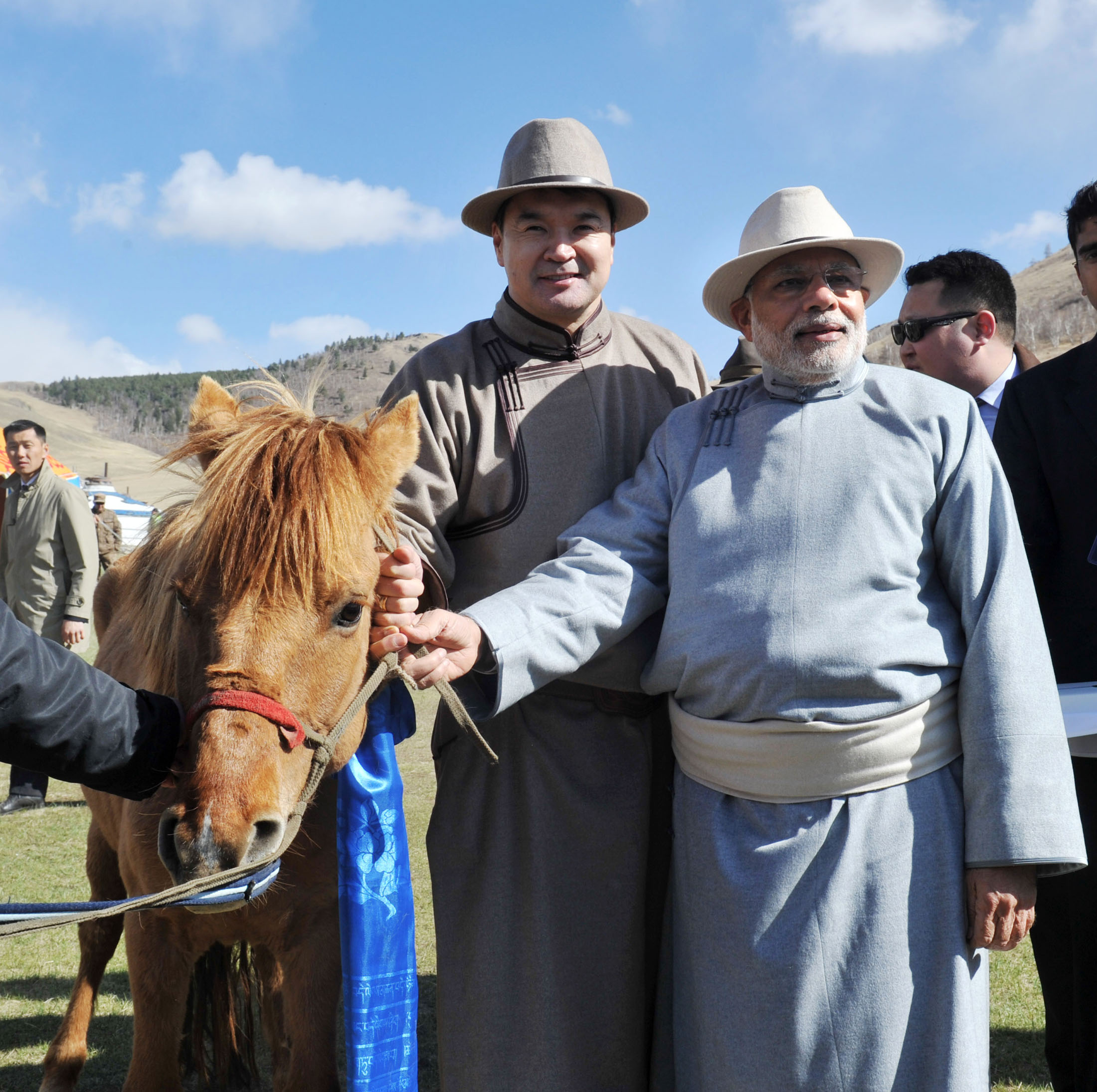
Indian Prime Minister Narendra Modi on a state visit to Mongolia in May 2015.

Indo-Mongolian relations have been growing ever since it was resolved to elevate ties to a "new level of partnership" during the India visit of Mongolian President Enkhbayar. India provides technical and economic cooperation to Mongolia in the fields of higher education, agriculture, information and communication technology and human resource development. Prime Minister of India Narendra Modi visited Mongolia on 16 May 2015, where he also addressed the Parliament. He also handed over Bhabhatron equipment to the National Cancer Centre in Mongolian capital Ulaanbaatar. Furthermore, during Prime Minister Narendra Modi's visit to in May 2015, a $1 Billion line of credit was extended to Mongolia, for infrastructure development, amongst many other fields.

In early 2021, India stepped up on the COVID-19 vaccine distribution to several countries, including Mongolia, to mitigate some of the delays by the WHO. India donated 13 boxes (150k doses) of the COVID-19 vaccine to Mongolia, making it one of the first 25 countries to receive the vaccine from India. During the donation ceremony, Ambassador of India to Mongolia M P Singh noted the importance of Mongolia for India's Act East policy as a strategic partner and ‘spiritual neighbour.’

In 2023, India and Mongolia have reviewed bilateral cooperation in hydrocarbons and steel sectors.

- The Project came in the backdrop of Mongolia, which has large uranium deposits signing an agreement for civil nuclear cooperation with India in 2009 and China unfolding its Belt and Road Initiative (BRI).
- India is opposed to the Belt and Road Initiative, which seeks to invest about US$8 trillion in infrastructure projects across Asia, Europe and Africa, as it says the initiative lures countries into debt traps and does not respect sovereignty.
- India is building an oil refinery in Mongolia which will serve 70% of country's population. The worth of the project is $1.2 billion.

== See also ==
- Foreign relations of India
- Foreign relations of Mongolia
- India–Kazakhstan relations
- India–Kyrgyzstan relations
- Mongol invasions of India
- Mongolians in India
- Mughal Empire
