= Mongolians in India =

Ethnic group in India

Mongolians in India Энэтхэг дахь Монголчууд
Total population
- 1,116 (2010)

Regions with significant populations
- Kalimpong · Mundgod · Visakhapatnam · Pune · New Delhi

Languages
- Mongolian · Tibetan · English · Sanskrit

Religion
- Buddhism

There is a small Mongolian community in India, comprising mostly Buddhist monks and scholars as well as international students from Mongolia.

== Migration history ==
=== Onward migration from Tibet ===
Mongolians who were originally studying in Tibet in the 1950s followed the Tibetans and fled to India after the 1950 invasion of Tibet and the 1959 Tibetan uprising. Many of them settled in Kalimpong, West Bengal. The Dilowa Hutukhtu maintained contact with them. American scholar Owen Lattimore suggested to then-Defence Minister of India Krishna Menon that they could be valuable sources of intelligence against the People's Republic of China about conditions in Tibet.

Mongolian scholars from Tibet made valuable contributions in Indian academia; for example, Lama Chimpa assisted George de Roerich in compiling a Russian-Sanskrit dictionary. Other noted Mongolian scholars in India from this era include Da-Lama, Rigzin Wangpo, Geshe Wanggyal, Geshe Kaldan, and Geshe Agwang Nima; some remained in Kalimpong, while others left the district to teach at famous universities including the Banaras Hindu University and the University of Delhi. Most continued as monks, but some returned to secular life, married, and had children. Tohtoh, one such young man, studied at the Central Tibetan School in Mussoorie, Uttarakhand before emigrating to the United States, where he was involved in founding the Mongol-American Cultural Association.

=== Direct migration from Mongolia ===
Ties between Mongolia and India were expanded by the efforts of the 19th Kushok Bakula Rinpoche. He was originally from Ladakh in India, but went to Lhasa to study at Drepung Monastery in the 1930s. He was instrumental in reviving Buddhism in Mongolia, arranging the Dalai Lama's visit to Mongolia in 1979, which resulted in an agreement for monks from Mongolia to come to India to study Buddhism. During his service as India's ambassador to Mongolia he encouraged more Mongolian monks to come to India and study at the Institute of Buddhist Dialectics in Dharamsala, in Karnataka at the Drepung Gomang in Mundgod or the Sera Monastery in Bylakuppe, and in other places. Due to his efforts the number of scholarships for Mongolians to study in India expanded from just a few to over one hundred.

In January 2004, India and Mongolia also signed an agreement to construct a Mongolian-run Buddhist temple in Bodh Gaya, Bihar, where according to Buddhist tradition Gautama Buddha attained enlightenment. The Bihar government gave a free grant of land on which to build the monastery; then-Prime Minister of Mongolia Nambaryn Enkhbayar personally laid the foundation stone. Construction was delayed due to a dispute with the local government, however the temple was inaugurated in 2017 by the Dalai Lama .

Penor Rinpoche's Kunzang Palyul Choling, in partnership with the Khamariin Khiid in Sainshand Sum, Dornogovi Province, Mongolia, began sponsoring Mongolians to study Buddhism in India at the Namdroling Monastery in Bylakuppe in 2005. Two came the first year. In 2006, American Buddhist author B. Alan Wallace sponsored eight more young men to join them. A group of nine Mongolian women entered the neighbouring Tsogyal Shedrup Dargyeling nunnery in 2008.

As of 2010 the office of the president of Mongolia estimated that more than 1,116 Mongolian citizens were living in India. About 300+ of them were students in Indian universities and colleges, a third in Delhi alone. About 20 Mongolian students were taking EFL courses at the International School of English Language in Solan, Himachal Pradesh as of 2009, and another 20 at the English and Foreign Languages University in Hyderabad, Andhra Pradesh. In Pune that same year, there were 10 or so Mongolian information technology trainees and students. More than 230 Mongolian student-monks were living in Mundgod as of 2011. In 2012 the Indian government announced that it would give 50 scholarships to Mongolian students to study in India.

== Notable people ==
- Nominjin, Mongolian pop star who lived in India for five years
- 9th Jebtsundamba Khutughtu, Mongolian Buddhist monk who had previously lived in Tibet

== See also ==
- India–Mongolia relations
- Buddhism in Mongolia
- Buddhism in North Karnataka
- Mongol invasions of India
- Mongolian diaspora
