= Rebellions against Alauddin Khalji =

1301 rebellions against the Sultan of Delhi

Alauddin Khalji, the ruler of the Delhi Sultanate in India, faced three rebellions in 1301. While engaged in the conquest of Ranthambore. The first rebellion was led by his nephew Akat Khan, who tried to assassinate him during a hunting expedition at Tilpat and was beheaded as a punishment. The second was also led by his nephews, this time Malik Umar and Mangu Khan, who started recruiting soldiers to overthrow Alauddin's rule in Awadh. The rebellion was crushed by Alauddin's loyal officers, and the rebels were executed. The third was staged by an officer named Haji Maula in Delhi. It was crushed by Alauddin's loyal officer Malik Hamiduddin, and once again the rebels were killed.

Earlier, in 1299, Alauddin's generals Nusrat Khan and Ulugh Khan had also faced a mutiny near Jalore. Alauddin held meetings with his council of ministers to determine the causes of these rebellions. Based on their advice, he took several measures to prevent any further uprisings: he set up an intelligence and surveillance network, instituted prohibition in Delhi, prevented the nobles from networking with each other and confiscated wealth from the residents of Delhi. After these steps were taken, no serious rebellions took place during Alauddin's reign.

== Akat Khan's rebellion ==
After his generals Ulugh Khan and Nusrat Khan failed to capture Ranthambore, Alauddin decided to lead a stronger force there in 1301. He ordered his other officers from various provinces to bring their armies to Tilpat near Delhi. While these armies were on their way to Tilpat, he spent his time hunting. During one such expedition, his nephew Sulaiman Shah Akat Khan (or Ikat Khan) conspired to kill him in the Badah village near Tilpat. Alauddin had ordered his horsemen to form a circle in order to drive the game towards him. Akat Khan and some Mongol Muslims in his service rode towards Alauddin, shouting "Tiger!", and started shooting arrows at the Sultan. A slave named Manik (or Nayak) threw himself in front of Alauddin, and received four arrow wounds. Then Alauddin's bodyguards came forward and protected him with shields. Despite these efforts and his heavy winter clothing, Alauddin received two deep arrow wounds in his arm and fell unconscious. When Akat Khan came closer, Alauddin's guards told him that the Sultan was dead.

Akat Khan then went to the royal camp, announced that he had killed Alauddin and proclaimed himself the new Sultan. Several officers welcomed him, but Malik Dinar, the officer in-charge of Alauddin's harem, resisted him. When Akat Khan tried to enter the harem, Malik Dinar asked him to present Alauddin's head as evidence of his claim of having killed him.

Meanwhile, Alauddin regained consciousness, and decided to flee to Ulugh Khan's camp, suspecting a deeper conspiracy by many nobles. However, his loyal officer Malik Hamiduddin advised him that his presence at the camp was necessary to quell the rebellion. Alauddin then proceeded to the camp with 500-600 horsemen. Akat Khan fled to Afghanpur, but two officers pursued him and killed him. They brought his head to Alauddin, who remarked that he often had that head in his lap. Akat Khan's head was paraded on a spear: first in Alauddin's camp at Tilpat, then throughout the imperial capital Delhi, then in Ulugh Khan's camp at Jhain. Alauddin then ordered the killing of Akat Khan's younger brother Qutlugh Khan.

Over the next few days Alauddin stayed at Tilpat to recover from his wounds. He also made inquiries into the conspiracy against him, and ordered severe punishments against those found guilty. Their wives and children were imprisoned and their property was confiscated.

== Rebellion of Malik Umar and Mangu Khan ==
Some days after Akat Khan's death, Alauddin marched to Ranthambore. While he was busy besieging Ranthambore, two of his nephews conspired to usurp power in Delhi. These were Malik Umar (the governor of Badaun) and Mangu Khan (the governor of Awadh). Both were sons of a sister of Alauddin.

The rebellion started in Awadh, but the cause is not certain. The two brothers started recruiting soldiers to overthrow Alauddin's rule. However, before they could cause any serious damage, Alauddin sent his officers to arrest them. The two brothers were brought to Ranthambore and had their "eyes carved out like slices of melon" before being killed. Their family members and followers were also killed.

== Rebellion of Haji Maula ==
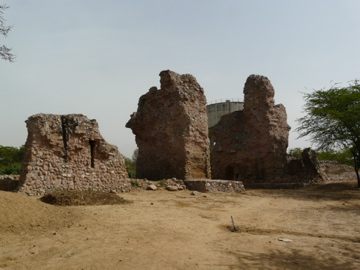
Southern Gate of the Siri Fort, now in ruins.

A third rebellion happened during Alauddin's Ranthambore campaign. Bayazid Tirmizi, who succeeded Ala al-Mulk as the kotwal of Delhi, had become very unpopular in the city because of his harshness. Taking advantage of his unpopularity, and of Alauddin's absence from Delhi, an officer named Haji Maula decided to take control of Delhi. He was the shunah (superintendent of crown lands) of Bartol, a town in the Doab region. He had earlier served Malikul Umara Fakhruddin, a former kotwal of Delhi, and enlisted the support of the Mamluk-era kotwali staff.

At that time Bayazid was supervising repairs to the Badaun Gate and had taken up residence in a small house nearby. During the month of Ramadan (May–June) in 1299, when most residents of Delhi were taking a siesta, Haji Maula arrived at Bayazid's residence, accompanied by four armed men. They summoned Bayazid to hear a message from Alauddin. When Bayazid came out Haji Maula ordered his killing. Haji Maula then produced a firman before the public, claiming that Alauddin had issued an order to kill Bayazid. He also summoned Alauddin Ayaz, the kotwal of the under-construction Siri Fort. However, Ayaz refused to oblige, and protected himself by ordering the closure of the Siri gates.

Haji Maula and his soldiers then took control of the royal Red Palace, the treasury, the armory, the horse stables and the prison. To gain supporters, he distributed the money from the treasury among the people of Delhi. He also freed the state prisoners, some of whom joined him.

Alauddin heard about the events in Delhi three days after the beginning of the revolt. He kept the news a secret from his soldiers at Ranthambore, but sent his loyal officer Malik Hamiduddin to quell the rebellion Delhi. Hamiduddin, who held the post of amir-i-koh, arrived in Delhi the next day, and entered through the Ghazni Gate.

Meanwhile, Haji Maula felt that his position was insecure, as he had no claim over the royal throne. He decided to install a puppet ruler. He abducted a man named Alavi, who was a descendant of a daughter of the earlier Sultan Iltutmish, "appointed" him the new Sultan of Delhi and forced the nobles to pay him homage. He also appointed his fellow rebels to various royal offices.

When the news of Alavi's appointment reached Alauddin, he sent his brother Ulugh Khan to Delhi. By the time Ulugh Khan reached Delhi, Hamiduddin had already quelled the revolt, defeating Haji Maula's forces after two days of fighting. He was supported by some of Zafar Khan's Amroha-based followers, who had come to Delhi for some court-related work. Haji Maula retreated to the Bhandarkal Gate, where Hamiduddin dragged him from his horse and killed him. He then killed Alavi at the Red Palace and had his head paraded around Delhi on a spear.

Hamiduddin's forces took control of the treasury and brought back the money that had been distributed by Haji Maula. All the surviving rebels were brought before Ulugh Khan and killed. The grandsons of Haji Maula's former master Fakhruddin were also killed, although they had not played any part in the rebellion.

== Measures for preventing rebellions ==
While engaged in siege of Ranthambore, Alauddin held meetings with his council (majlis-i khas) to determine the causes of these rebellions. The council consisted of Alauddin's loyal officials, including Malik Ainul Mulk Multani, Malik Hamiduddin and Malik A'izzuddin. According to 14th-century chronicler Ziauddin Barani, the council listed the four main causes of rebellions:

1. The ignorance of the king about the good and bad acts of the people;
2. Liquor, which allows people to form alliances and hatch conspiracies at drinking parties;
3. Closeness and kinship among the nobles: if one of them is punished, the others join him because of blood ties and friendships;
4. Money: When people have money they have time to think about rebellions and conspiracies; when they don't, they are busy earning their livelihoods.

After returning from Ranthambore, Alauddin stayed in the suburbs of Delhi, where he spent a month on hunting expeditions. Contemporary chroniclers state that he was unhappy with the residents of Delhi, who had displayed their disloyalty during the recent rebellions. However, historian Kishori Saran Lal theorizes that Alauddin did not enter the city, because he was distressed as a result of the rebellions. His predecessor Jalaluddin had also avoided entering Delhi under similar circumstances.

Subsequently, Alauddin took steps to remove the four causes of rebellions outlined by his council, as detailed below. These steps had the desired outcome and prevented any serious revolts against Alauddin in the following years.

=== Intelligence and surveillance system ===
To ensure that he was not ignorant of the happenings in his kingdom, Alauddin organized an intelligence and surveillance system network comprising spies (munhis), publicly known intelligence officers (barids) and their officer-in-charge. These people were assigned to report on everything that happened in the houses of the nobles and the public markets. This fear of spies intimidated the nobles, who took great care in not saying or doing anything that could attract punishment.

=== Prohibition ===
Per his council's advice, Alauddin instituted a total prohibition on alcohol in Delhi. This was motivated by political, rather than religious, considerations. He gave up drinking himself and ordered the royal drinking vessels to be broken in front of the Badaun Gate. The formerly licensed taverns and distilleries were asked to move out of Delhi, although this meant a loss of revenue for the state. Alauddin also banned gambling and consumption of bhang. Amir Khusrau also claims that Alauddin forced prostitutes to get married, although the veracity of this statement is doubtful.

Alauddin's elephant-mounted officers patrolled the streets of Delhi, reading out the prohibition orders. Some people disobeyed them by preparing illicit liquor at their houses and selling it at high prices. Some also tried to sneak liquor into Delhi from outside the city. Alauddin ordered all these people to be thrown into dry wells dug near the Badaun Gate. Most of them died, and those who survived were severely injured.

As a result of these steps, liquor became unavailable not only in Delhi but also in its suburbs. The prohibition was unpopular, and ultimately Alauddin had to make some concessions. He issued an order allowing people to distill liquor in their own homes for private consumption. However, the ban on selling alcohol and organizing drinking parties continued.

=== Control over the nobles ===
According to Barani, Alauddin issued an order preventing the nobles, aristocrats and important officials from visiting each other's houses and gathering at banquets. They were also forbidden from inviting the general public to their houses. Marital relations among their families were allowed only with prior permission from the Sultan. According to Firishta, if a noble wanted to put up a guest or arrange a marriage, he had to obtain the Sultan's permission by writing to Sayyid Khan Wazir.

Barani further states that there was strict enforcement of these rules. Even when the nobles met each other at the royal palace, they could not talk with ease. They took great care to avoid people with bad reputations.

=== Confiscation of wealth ===
After ascending the throne of Delhi, Alauddin had made a number of state grants (milk), state gifts (inam) and charitable endowments (waqf). Per the council's suggestions, he canceled all these grants to control the monetary supply. The villages that had earlier been granted as milk, inam or waqf were re-designated as khalisa (a territory whose revenues go directly to the royal treasury). However, there were many exceptions to this order; for example, 14th-century chronicler Isami writes that the villages granted to his ancestors were not canceled.

Barani gives an exaggerated account of Alauddin's seizure of money and valuables from his subjects. According to him, after Alauddin's orders had been carried out, little gold was left in the houses of Delhi. The only exceptions were the houses of the nobles, the aristocrats, state employees and Hindu merchants and bankers.
