= Mongol invasions of India =

Series of military offensives (1221–1327)

- Part of the Mongol invasions and conquests
Date	24 November 1221–1327
Location	Northern Indian subcontinent
Result	Delhi Sultanate victory

Belligerents
Mongol Empire: Chagatai Khanate; Qara'unas	Delhi Sultanate

Commanders and leaders
Qutlugh Khwaja (DOW); Ali beg †; Tartaq †; Taraghai; Kopek; Hiljak; Iqbalmand; Abdullah (Note: The son of Hulegu Khan.); Targhi; Saldi; Zulju; Tarmashirin; Tair Bahadur	(Delhi Sultanate) Iltutmish (Delhi Sultanate) Ghiyasuddin Balban (Delhi Sultanate) Jalal-ud-Din Khalji (Delhi Sultanate) Alauddin Khalji (Delhi Sultanate) Zafar Khan † (Delhi Sultanate) Malik Kafur (Delhi Sultanate) Ulugh Khan (Delhi Sultanate) Nusrat Khan Jalesari (Delhi Sultanate) Ghiyath al-Din Tughluq (Delhi Sultanate) Sultan Chanesar II Soomro (Delhi Sultanate) Ikhtyaruddin Qaraqash (Delhi Sultanate) Dindar Muhammad † (Delhi Sultanate) Aqsanqar †

The Mongol Empire launched numerous invasions into the Indian subcontinent from 1221 to 1327, with many of the later raids made by the Qara'unas of Mongol origin. The Mongols occupied parts of the subcontinent for decades. As the Mongols progressed into the Indian hinterland and reached the outskirts of Delhi, the Delhi Sultanate of India led a campaign against them in which the Mongol army suffered serious defeats.

Delhi Sultanate officials viewed war with the Mongols as one of the sultan's primary duties. While the sultanate's chroniclers described the conflicts between the Tengrist Mongols and Muslim community in binary terms, with the Delhi Sultanate being an island of Islamic civilization surrounded by Hindus and Buddhist to its north and south, it ignored the fact that a large number of the sultanate's elites and monarchs were of Turkic/Mongol ethnicity or had previously served in their armed contingents.

== Background ==
After pursuing Jalal al-Din into India from Samarkand and defeating him at the Battle of Indus in 1221, Genghis Khan sent two tumens (20,000 soldiers in total) under commanders Dorbei the Fierce and Bala to continue the chase. The Mongol commander Bala chased Jalal ad-Din throughout the Lahore region and attacked outlying province Multan, and even sacked the outskirts of Lahore. Jalal ad-Din regrouped, forming a small army from survivors of the battle and sought an alliance, or even an asylum, with the Sultan of Delhi Sultanate, Iltutmish, but was turned down.

While fighting against the local governor of Sindh, Jalal ad-Din heard of an uprising in the Kirman province of southern Iran and he immediately set out for that place, passing through southern Baluchistan on the way. Jalal ad-Din was also joined by forces from Ghor and Peshawar, including members of the Khalji, Turkoman, and Ghori tribes. With his new allies he marched on Ghazni and defeated a Mongol division under Turtai, which had been assigned the task of hunting him down. The victorious allies quarreled over the division of the captured booty; subsequently the Khalji, Turkoman, and Ghori tribesmen deserted Jalal ad-Din and returned to Peshawar. By this time Ögedei Khan, third son of Genghis Khan, had become Great Khan of the Mongol Empire. A Mongol general named Chormaqan sent by the Khan attacked and defeated Jalal ad-Din, thus ending the Khwārazm-Shāh dynasty.

=== Mongol conquest of Kashmir ===
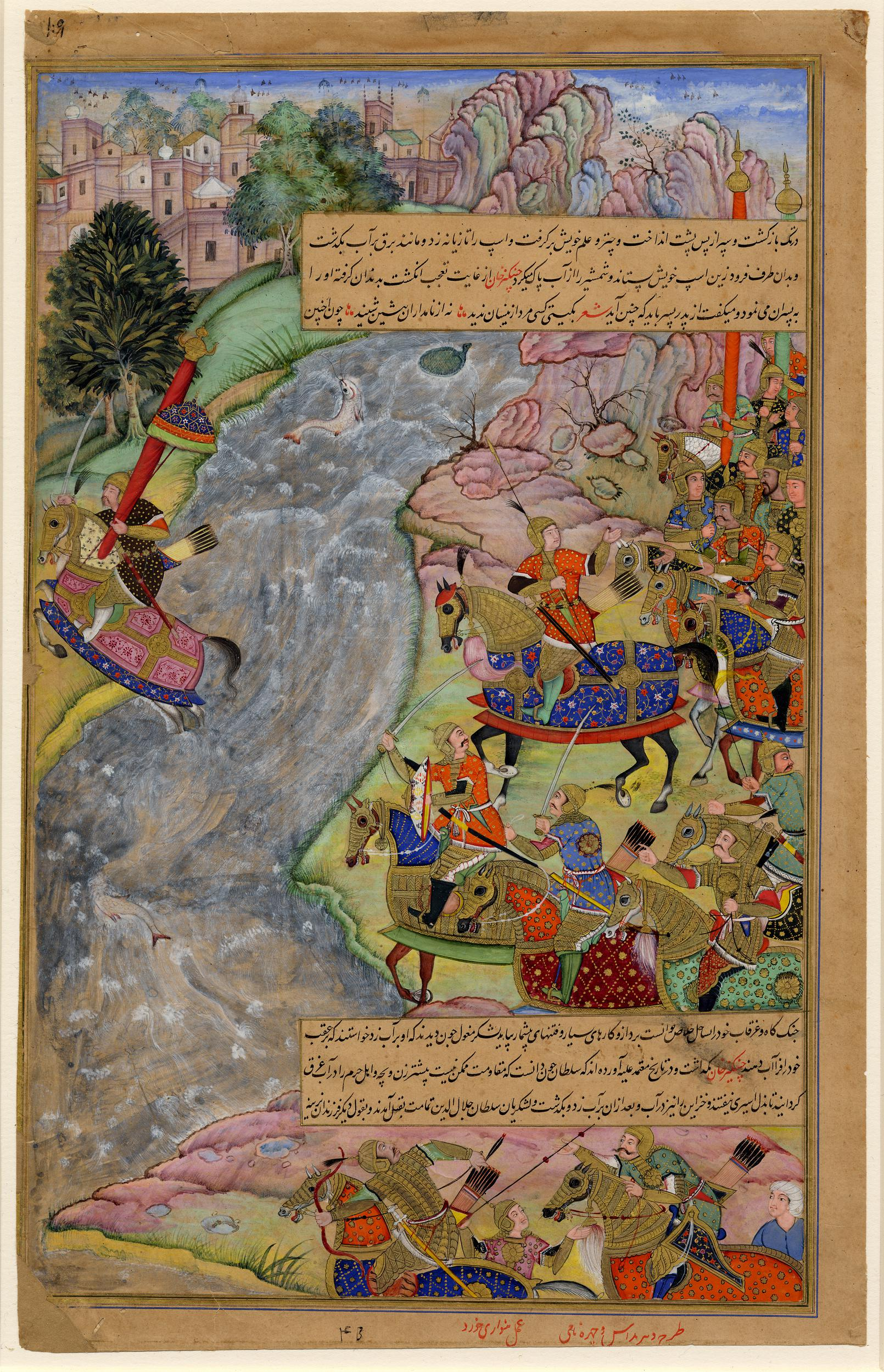
Artist's depiction of Jalal al-Din Mangburni fleeing after the Battle of the Indus

Some time after 1235 another Mongol force invaded Kashmir, stationing a darughachi (administrative governor) there for several years, and Kashmir became a Mongolian dependency. Around the same time, a Kashmiri Buddhist master, Otochi, and his brother Namo arrived at the court of Ögedei. Another Mongol general named Pakchak attacked Peshawar and defeated the army of tribes who had deserted Jalal ad-Din but were still a threat to the Mongols. These men, mostly Khaljis, escaped to Multan and were recruited into the army of the Delhi Sultanate. In winter 1241 the Mongol force invaded the Indus valley and besieged Lahore. However, on 30 December 1241, the Mongols under Munggetu butchered the town before withdrawing from the Delhi Sultanate. At the same time the Great Khan Ögedei died (1241).

The Kashmiris revolted in 1254–1255, and Möngke Khan, who became Great Khan in 1251, appointed his generals, Sali and Takudar, to replace the court and appointed the Buddhist master, Otochi, as darugachi of Kashmir. However, the Kashmiri king killed Otochi at Srinagar. Sali invaded Kashmir, killing the king, and put down the rebellion, after which the country remained subject to the Mongol Empire for many years.

== Intrusion into the Delhi Sultanate ==
The Delhi prince Jalal al-Din Masud, traveled to the Mongol capital at Karakorum to seek the assistance of Möngke Khan in seizing the throne from his elder brother in 1248. When Möngke was crowned as Great Khan, Jalal al-Din Masud attended the ceremony and asked for help from Möngke. Möngke ordered Sali Noyan to assist him to recover his ancestral realm. Sali Noyan made successive attacks on Multan and Lahore. Shams-uddin Muhammad Kurt I, the client malik (ruling prince) of Herat, accompanied the Mongols. Jalal al-Din Masud was installed as client ruler of Lahore, Kunjah and Sodhra. In 1257 the governor of Sindh offered his entire province to Hulegu Khan, Möngke's brother, and sought Mongol protection from his overlord in Delhi. Hulegu led a strong force under Sali Noyan into Sindh.

But Hulegu refused to sanction a grand invasion of the Delhi Sultanate and a few years later diplomatic correspondence between the two rulers confirmed the growing desire for peace.

Ghiyas ud din Balban's (r.1266–1287) one absorbing preoccupation was the danger of a Mongol invasion. For this cause he organized and disciplined his army to the highest point of efficiency; for this he made away with disaffected or jealous chiefs, and steadily refused to entrust authority to Hindus; for this he stayed near his capital and would not be tempted into distant campaigns.

Large-scale Mongol invasions of India ceased and the Delhi sultans used the respite to recover the frontier towns like Multan, Uch, and Lahore, and to punish the local ranas and rais who had joined hands with either the Khwarazmian or the Mongol invaders.

== Chagatai–Delhi Wars ==
Persistent, smaller-scale raiding that plagued northwestern frontier for decades beyond the headline sieges of Delhi. Contemporary chroniclers like Minhaj-i-Siraj Juzjani (in Tabaqat-i-Nasiri) and Ziauddin Barani (in Tarikh-i-Firuz Shahi) describe near-constant hit and run tactics employed by Mongol detachments, primarily from the unstable Chagatai Khanate, between major invasions (roughly 1241-1290). These raids, often timed to coincide with harvest seasons, systematically devastated the fertile provinces of Multan, Sindh, and Lahore, deliberately targeting agricultural infrastructure and peasant populations to cripple the Sultanate's economic base and tax revenue.

After a civil war broke out in the Mongol Empire in the 1260s, the Chagatai Khanate controlled Central Asia which leader since the 1280s was Duwa Khan, who was second in command of Kaidu Khan. Duwa was active in Afghanistan, and attempted to extend Mongol rule into India.

The Muslim Negudari governor Abdullah, who was a son of Chagatai Khan's great-grandson, invaded Punjab with his force in 1292, but his advance guard under Ulghu was defeated and taken prisoner by the Khalji sultan Jalaluddin. The medieval sources claim invasions by hundreds of thousands of Mongols, numbers approximating (and probably based on) the size of the entire cavalry armies of the Mongol realms of Central Asia or Western Asia. The number of 150,000 Mongol invaders during 1292 opposed by Jalaluddin were also recorded in Wolseley Haig's work of The Cambridge History of India. A count of the Mongol commanders named in the sources as participating in the various invasions might give a better indication of the numbers involved, as these commanders probably led tumens, units nominally of 10,000 men. These invasions were led by either various descendants of Genghis Khan or by Mongol divisional commanders; the size of such armies was always between 10,000 and 30,000 cavalry although the chroniclers of Delhi exaggerated the number to 100,000-200,000 cavalry. The 4,000 Mongol captives of the advance guard converted to Islam and came to live in Delhi as "new Muslims". The suburb they lived in was appropriately named Mughalpura. Chagatai tumens were defeated by the Delhi Sultanate several times in 1296–1297.

Unlike the previous invasions, the invasions during the reign of Jalaluddin's successor Alauddin were major Mongol conquests. In the winter of 1297, the Chagatai noyan Kadar led an army that ravaged the Punjab region, and advanced as far as Kasur. Alauddin's army, led by Ulugh Khan and probably Zafar Khan, defeated the invaders on the Battle of Jaran-Manjur on 6 February 1298, where quite a large number of them were taken prisoner. Later in 1298–1299, a Mongol army (possibly Neguderi fugitives) invaded Sindh, and occupied the fort of Shivistan. These Mongols were defeated by Zafar Khan: a number of them were arrested and brought to Delhi as captives. At this time, the main branch of Alauddin's army, led by Ulugh Khan and Nusrat Khan was busy raiding Gujarat. When this army was returning from Gujarat to Delhi, some of its Mongol soldiers (former captives) staged a mutiny over payment of khums (one-fifth of the share of loot). The mutiny was crushed, and the mutineers' families in Delhi were severely punished.

In late 1299, Duwa Khan dispatched his son Qutlugh Khwaja to conquer Delhi. Alauddin Khalji led his army to Kili near Delhi, and tried to delay the battle, hoping that the Mongols would retreat amid a scarcity of provisions and that he would receive reinforcements from his provinces. However, his general Zafar Khan attacked the Mongol army without his permission. The Mongols feigned a retreat, and tricked Zafar Khan's contingent into following them. Zafar Khan and his men were killed after inflicting heavy casualties on the invaders. The Mongols retreated a couple of days later: their leader Qutlugh Khwaja was seriously wounded, and died during the return journey. In the winter of 1302–1303, Alauddin dispatched an army to ransack the Kakatiya (a Telugu dynasty) capital Warangal, and himself marched to Chittor. Finding Delhi unprotected, the Mongols launched another invasion around August 1303. Alauddin managed to reach Delhi before the invaders, but did not have enough time to prepare for a strong defence. He took shelter in a heavily guarded camp at the under construction Siri Fort. The Mongols ransacked Delhi and its neighbourhoods, but ultimately retreated after being unable to breach Siri. This close encounter with the Mongols prompted Alauddin to strengthen the forts and the military presence along their routes to India. He also implemented a series of economic reforms to ensure sufficient revenue inflows for maintaining a strong army.

Shortly afterward, Duwa Khan sought to end the ongoing conflict with the Yuan Khan Temür Öljeyitü, and around 1304 a general peace among the Mongol khanates was declared, bringing an end to the conflict between the Yuan dynasty and western khanates that had lasted for the better part of a half century. Soon after, he proposed a joint attack on India, but the campaign did not materialize. In December 1305, Duwa sent another 30,000 to 50,000 strong army that bypassed the heavily guarded city of Delhi, and proceeded southeast to the Gangetic plains along the Himalayan foothills. Alauddin's 30,000-strong cavalry, led by Malik Nayak, defeated the Mongols at the Battle of Amroha. A large number of Mongols were taken captive and killed. In 1306, another Mongol army sent by Duwa advanced up to the Ravi River, ransacking the territories along the way. This army included three contingents, led by Kopek, Iqbalmand, and Tai-Bu. Alauddin's forces, led by Malik Kafur, decisively defeated the invaders. In 1307 Duwa died and in the dispute over his succession this spate of Mongol raids into India already ended. Taking advantage of this situation, Alauddin's general Malik Tughluq regularly raided the Mongol territories located in present-day Afghanistan. Tughluq, Alauddin's governor of Dipalpur, adopted an aggressive policy against the Mongols. Over the next few years, he annually raided Kabul, Ghazni, Kandahar, and Garmsir, which were located on the Mongol frontier. He plundered these territories, and levied tribute on the residents, without any resistance from the Chagatai Khanate. Amir Khusrau, in his Tughluq-Nama, alludes to Tughluq's 20 victories, most of which were against the Mongols. Barani states that Tughluq, who also received the iqta' of Lahore at some point, defeated the Mongols 20 times. The Moroccan traveler Ibn Battuta states that a mosque in Multan had an inscription, in which Tughluq claimed to have defeated the Mongols 29 times. It is uncertain if these victories refer to the above-mentioned raids.

== Late Mongol invasions ==
In 1320 the Qara'unas under Zulju (Dulucha) entered Kashmir by the Jehlam Valley without meeting any serious resistance. The Kashmiri king, Suhadeva, tried to persuade Zulju to withdraw by paying a large ransom. After he failed to organize resistance, Suhadeva fled to Kishtwar, leaving the people of Kashmir to the mercy of Zulju. The Mongols burned the dwellings, massacred the men and made women and children slaves. Only refugees under Ramacandra, commander in chief of the king, in the fort of Lar remained safe. The invaders continued to pillage for eight months until the commencement of winter. When Zulju was departing via Brinal, he lost most of his men and prisoners due to a severe snowfall in Divasar district. His departure paved the way for a Buddhist prince Rinchan and a former councillor Shah Mir who established the Kashmir Sultanate.

The next major Mongol invasion took place after the Khaljis had been replaced by the Tughlaq dynasty in the Sultanate. In 1327 the Chagatai Mongols under Tarmashirin, who had sent envoys to Delhi to negotiate peace the previous year, sacked the frontier towns of Lamghan and Multan and besieged Delhi. The Tughlaq rulers of the Sultanate tried to save it from further ravages. Muhammad bin Tughluq asked the Ilkhan Abu Sa'id to form an alliance against Tarmashirin, who had invaded Khorasan, but an attack didn't materialize. Tarmashirin was a Buddhist who later converted to Islam. Religious tensions in the Chagatai Khanate were a divisive factor among the Mongols.

No more large-scale invasions or raids into India were launched after Tamashirin's siege of Delhi. However, small groups of Mongol adventurers hired out their swords to the many local powers in the northwest. Amir Qazaghan raided northern India with his Qara'unas. He also sent several thousand troops to aid the Delhi sultan Muhammad bin Tughluq in suppressing the rebellion in his country in 1350.

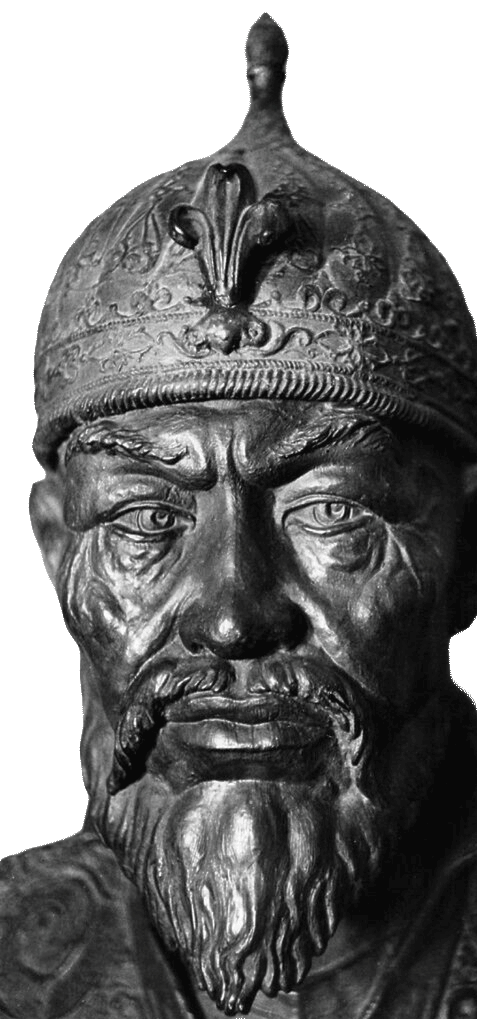
Timur

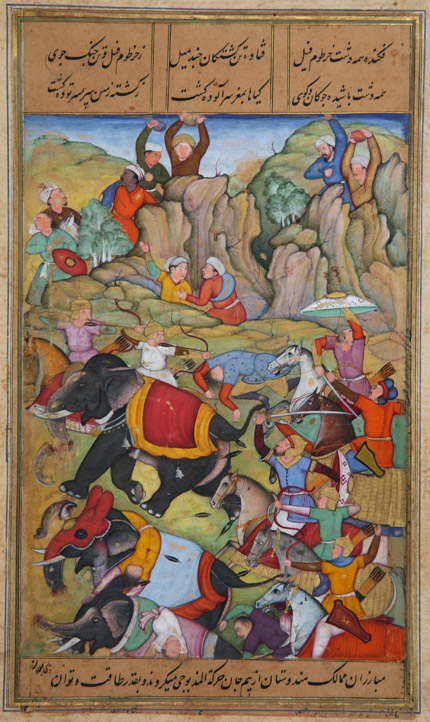
Timur defeats the Sultan of Delhi, Nasir Al-Din Mahmud Tughluq, in the winter of 1397–1398

The Delhi sultans had developed cordial relations with the Yuan dynasty in Mongolia and China and the Ilkhanate in Persia and the Middle East. Around 1338, Sultan Muhammad bin Tughluq of the Delhi Sultanate appointed Moroccan traveler Ibn Battuta an ambassador to the Yuan court under Toghon Temür (Emperor Huizong). The gifts he was to take included 200 slaves.

The Chagatai Khanate had split up by this time and an ambitious Chagatai Mongol chieftain named Timur claiming Mongol descent had brought Central Asia and the regions beyond under his control. He launched an invasion of the Delhi Sultanate and sacked the capital. Timur's empire broke up and his descendants failed to hold on to Central Asia, which split up into numerous principalities. One of his descendants established Mughal Empire in India.

== See also ==
- India–Mongolia relations
- Sali Noyan
- Protectorate General to Pacify the West
- Patola Shahis
- Battle of Talas
- Mongol invasion of Sindh
- Mongol invasion of India (1297–1298)
- Mongol invasion of India (1303)
- Mongol invasion of India (1306)
