= Alauddin Khalji's conquest of Multan =

Military expedition of Alauddin Khalji

Delhi (in present-day India) and Multan (in present-day Pakistan)

In November 1296, the Delhi Sultanate ruler Alauddin Khalji sent an expedition to conquer Multan. His objective was to eliminate the surviving family members of his predecessor Jalaluddin Khalji, whom he had assassinated to usurp the throne of Delhi. Multan was governed by Jalaluddin's eldest son Arkali Khan. Alauddin's generals Ulugh Khan and Zafar Khan besieged Multan for around two months. They managed to gain control of the city after Arkali Khan's officers defected to their side. The surviving family members of Jalaluddin were imprisoned, and later, several of them were either blinded or killed.

== Background ==
Alauddin had become the ruler of the Delhi Sultanate after assassinating his father-in-law Jalaluddin. Multan, which was located in the Punjab region to the north-west of Delhi, was under the control of Jalaluddin's eldest son Arkali Khan. Jalaluddin's widow (the former queen or Malka-i-Jahan) and his younger son Ruknuddin Ibrahim had taken shelter in Multan after fleeing Delhi. After strengthening his control over Delhi, Alauddin decided to conquer Multan and eliminate the surviving family of Jalaluddin.

== Siege of Multan ==
Alauddin himself did not lead an expedition to Multan, as it was important for him to remain in Delhi to keep control of the recently gained throne. Instead, he sent an army led by Ulugh Khan and Zafar Khan to Multan in November 1296. This army, which had 30,000-40,000 soldiers, besieged Multan immediately after reaching the town.

Arkali Khan had anticipated Alauddin's invasion, and was adequately prepared for the siege. However, after two months of being besieged, his kotwal (fort commander) and some leading citizens were convinced that Alauddin's forces would ultimately emerge victorious. Therefore, they deserted Arkali Khan, and joined Alauddin's forces.

A dejected Arkali Khan then sought help of Shaikh Ruknuddin, who engineered a truce between the warring parties. Shaikh Ruknuddin took Arkali Khan and his younger brother Ruknuddin Ibrahim to Ulugh Khan's camp. Ulugh Khan received them with dignity. At Shaikh Ruknuddin's request, Alauddin's generals promised not to harm the prisoners. However, they did not keep their promise after occupying Multan. Jalaluddin's family and the nobles supportive of them were taken into custody.

== Aftermath ==
After taking control of Multan, Ulugh Khan and Zafar Khan marched to Delhi with the prisoners. Meanwhile, Alauddin dispatched Nusrat Khan from Delhi, with instructions to punish the prisoners. Nusrat Khan met the contingent returning from Multan at Abohar. He blinded Jalaluddin's sons Arkali Khan and Ruknuddin Ibrahim, and later imprisoned them at Hansi. Their loyal officers Ulghu (or Malik Alghu) and Malik Ahmad Chap were also blinded, and Arkali Khan's sons were killed. Jalaluddin's widow (the former Malka-i-Jahan) and other ladies of the harem were brought to Delhi along with Ahmad Chap. These surviving prisoners were kept under surveillance at Nusrat Khan's house in Delhi. Alauddin appointed Nusrat Khan as his wazir (prime minister) shortly after the conquest of Multan.

== See also ==
- Siege of Multan
