= Panacea Medical Technologies =

Panacea Medical Technologies Pvt. Ltd.
- Company type: Private
- Founded: 1999
- Headquarters: Bangalore, India
- Founder: GV Subrahmanyam (MD)
- Services: Medical device Radiation therapy
- Website: panaceamedical.com

Panacea Medical Technologies Pvt. Ltd., headquartered in Bangalore, India is a developer, manufacturer and healthcare service provider of radiotherapy and radiology equipment for the diagnosis and treatment of cancer.

Panacea has its radiotherapy machines installed in 55 Indian hospitals. Their tele-cobalt radiotherapy unit Bhabhatron II, developed in collaboration with Bhabha Atomic Research Center was gifted by the Government of India to Malawi, Kyrgyzstan, Kenya, Madagascar, which has helped the hospitals to treat over 100,000 cancer patients.

Panacea has developed many technologies related to radiation therapy and diagnosis. Currently, Panacea has produced four pioneer equipment into the market, namely BHABHATRON-II Telecobalt Unit, IMAGIN Simulator, SIDDHARTH-II Linear Accelerator, BHABHATRON-3i IGRT based Gamma therapy unit in radiotherapy and LILAC Digital Mammography Unit in the radiology market.

Panacea has Clinical collaborations with Bhabha Atomic Research Centre (BARC), Society for Applied Microwave Electronic Engineering and Research (SAMEER), All India Institute of Medical Science (AIIMS) and Tata Medical Centre (TMC) as well as technology collaboration with the National Institutes of Health (NIH) and Department of Biotechnology of the Government of India and recognized by the Department of Scientific and Industrial research (DSIR) of the Government of India. The products are CE certified, IEC compliant and ZED certified.

Today their machines can treat about 70-100 patients in a day and the machine's lifetime cost is 50-60% lower than that of the foreign players.

== History ==
In 1999, Panacea Medical Technologies Pvt. Ltd. was founded in Bangalore by a senior scientist G V Subramanhyam. The company has worked with the Bhabha Atomic Research Centre (BARC) and Society for Applied Microwave Electronic Engineering and Research (SAMEER) to collaborate on the design of a tele-cobalt radiotherapy unit and linear accelerator. The company took six years to design, develop, manufacture and get a regulatory approval for its first product. Post the launch in 2007, Panacea has increased its installation base in India and other countries.
