= Ulugh Khan =

General of the Delhi Sultanate (died 1302)

Almas Beg (died c. 1302), better known by his title Ulugh Khan, was a brother and a general of the Delhi Sultanate ruler Alauddin Khalji. He held the iqta' of Bayana in present-day India.

Ulugh Khan played an important role in Alauddin's ascension to the throne of Delhi in 1296. He lured the former Sultan Jalaluddin to Kara, where Alauddin assassinated Jalaluddin. He successfully besieged Multan, governed by Jalaluddin's eldest son Arkali Khan, and subjugated the surviving members of Jalaluddin's family.

In 1298, Ulugh Khan repulsed a Mongol invasion from the Chagatai Khanate, which greatly increased Alauddin's prestige. The next year, he and Nusrat Khan raided the wealthy province of Gujarat, obtaining a huge amount of wealth for Alauddin's treasury. He led the reinforcement unit in the Battle of Kili (1299) against the Mongols, and held command in the initial phases of the Siege of Ranthambore (1301). He died a few months after the Ranthambore campaign ended.

== Early life ==
Ulugh Khan was originally known as Almas Beg. His father, Shihabuddin Mas'ud, was the elder brother of the Khalji dynasty's founder Sultan Jalaluddin. Besides his elder brother Alauddin (originally known as Ali Gurshasp), he had two other brothers Qutlugh Tigin and Muhammad.

Both Alauddin and Ulugh Khan married Jalaluddin's daughters. After Jalaluddin became the Sultan of Delhi, Alauddin was appointed as Amir-i-Tuzuk (equivalent to Master of ceremonies), while Almas Beg was given the post of Akhur-beg (equivalent to Master of the Horse).

== Role in Alauddin's ascension ==
In 1291, Jalaluddin appointed Alauddin as the governor of Kara province. Over the next few years, Alauddin hatched a conspiracy to overthrow Jalaluddin. In 1296, Alauddin raided Devagiri, but did not surrender the loot to Jalaluddin in Delhi. Instead, he returned to Kara, and then sent a letter of apology to Jalaluddin. Ulugh Khan assured Jalaluddin that Alauddin was loyal to him, and convinced him to visit Kara and meet Alauddin, saying that Alauddin would commit suicide out of guilt if Jalaluddin didn't pardon him personally. A gullible Jalaluddin visited Kara, where Alauddin killed him on 20 July 1296.

When Alauddin became the Sultan of Delhi in 1296, he made his brother barbeg with the title Ulugh Khan ("Great Khan".).

== Military career ==
Ulugh Khan was an able general, and played an important role in Alauddin's military conquests. According to Ziauddin Barani, Alauddin once thought of establishing a new religion, and compared his four generals (Ulugh, Nusrat, Zafar and Alp) to Muhammad's four Rashidun caliphs.

=== Siege of Multan ===
After usurping the throne of Delhi, Alauddin decided to eliminate the surviving family of Jalaluddin. In November 1296, he sent a 30,000-40,000 strong army led by Ulugh Khan and Zafar Khan to Multan, which was governed by Jalaluddin's son Arkali Khan. Faced with certain defeat, the leaders of the defending forces deserted Arkali Khan and defected to the Delhi forces after two months of siege.

Arkali Khan and his younger brother Ruknuddin Ibrahim visited Ulugh Khan's camp to negotiate a truce. Ulugh Khan received them with dignity, and promised not to harm them. However, after occupying Multan, he did not keep this promise, and imprisoned them, their family members, and their loyal officers. The captives were later blinded and/or killed by Nusrat Khan on Alauddin's orders.

=== 1298 victory over the Mongols ===
In the winter of 1297, the Mongols led by a noyan of the Chagatai Khanate raided Punjab, advancing as far as Kasur. Alauddin dispatched Ulugh Khan (possibly supported by Zafar Khan) to check the Mongol advance. According to the Delhi courtier Amir Khusrau, Ulugh Khan covered the distance of two marches in a single day to face the Mongols, and reached the banks of the Sutlej River on 6 February 1298. There, he ordered his soldiers to cross the Sutlej River without the boats, and inflicted a crushing defeat on the Mongols. Khusrau states that 20,000 Mongols were killed in the battle, and many more were killed in Delhi after being brought there as captives. The victory increased Alauddin's prestige, and stabilized his position on the throne of Delhi.

=== Gujarat ===
In early 1299, Alauddin sent an army led by Ulugh Khan and Nusrat Khan to invade the wealthy Vaghela-ruled kingdom of Gujarat. According to the Jain chronicler Jinaprabha Suri, Ulugh Khan's forces defeated the army of the defending king Karna at Asapalli (present-day Ahmedabad). Karna fled from the battlefield, after which Ulugh Khan's army thoroughly sacked the wealthy city of Anahilavada (Patan). According to Jinaprabha, Ulugh Khan and Nusrat Khan destroyed hundreds of other towns, including Asapalli, Vanmanthali and Surat. They also looted several monasteries, palaces, and temples. This account is also confirmed by the Muslim chroniclers Ziauddin Barani and Isami.

The Delhi army left Gujarat with a huge amount of wealth and several prisoners. During a halt near Jalore, Ulugh Khan and Nusrat Khan punished some of the soldiers for not remitting the khums (one-fifth share of the loot) to the imperial treasury. This resulted in a mutiny, mainly by the Mongol soldiers, who had converted to Islam recently. The mutineers murdered Ulugh Khan's secretary and Nusrat Khan's brother Malik A'izzudin. The next day, around 2000-3000 of them attacked Ulugh Khan's camp. The attackers misidentified a nephew of Alauddin as Ulugh Khan, and killed him. Ulugh Khan, who was in a lavatory at the time of the attack, escaped to Nusrat Khan's tent, where the loyal soldiers assembled and forced the rebels to retreat. After the army reached Delhi, severe punishments were meted out to the family members of the rebels.

=== Battle of Kili ===
While Ulugh Khan and Nusrat Khan were in Gujarat, Zafar Khan repulsed a Mongol invasion in Sindh. This victory established Zafar Khan's reputation as a brilliant general, and according to the near-contemporary chronicler Ziauddin Barani, made both Alauddin and Ulugh Khan jealous of Zafar Khan's newly acquired fame. Barani also claims that the two brothers made plans to blind or poison Zafar Khan. Historian Banarsi Prasad Saksena doubts the truthfulness of Barani's allegations.

At the 1299 Battle of Kili against the Mongols, Ulugh Khan led the reinforcement unit of the Delhi army. During the battle, Zafar Khan attacked a Mongol contingent without Alauddin's permission, and was killed after inflicting heavy casualties on the Mongols. According to the 17th-century historian Hajiuddabir's Zafarul-vali, Ulugh Khan did not come to Zafar Khan's rescue because he maintained an ill-will towards Zafar Khan. The Mongols ultimately retreated from the battlefield.

=== Siege of Ranthambhore ===
In 1299, Hammira, the Chahamana ruler of Ranthambore, had granted asylum to the Mongol fugitives who had led the mutiny against Ulugh Khan at Jalore. Ulugh Khan, who was the governor of Bayana near Ranthambore, urged Hammira to kill these fugitives as a friendly ruler or face an invasion. When Hammira refused to kill or surrender the fugitives, Alauddin ordered Ulugh Khan to invade Ranthambore in 1301.

Ulugh Khan marched up to the Banas River, where he defeated and killed Hammira's general Bhimasimha. Subsequently, the Delhi army suffered a defeat at a mountain pass called Hinduvata. Alauddin dispatched Nusrat Khan in support of Ulugh Khan, and the reinforced Delhi army once again marched towards Ranthambore. According to the Hammira Mahakavya, this time, Ulugh Khan pretended that he was coming to negotiate a truce with Hammira, and therefore, Hammira allowed him to cross the Hinduvata mountain pass. The Delhi army captured Jhain, and then reached Ranthambore, where Nusrat Khan was killed during the siege. Taking advantage of the mourning in the invaders' camp, Hammira's army attacked them, and forced Ulugh Khan to retreat to Jhain.

When Alauddin learned about Ulugh Khan's defeat, he personally led a stronger army to Ranthambore. While he was at Ranthambore, an officer called Haji Maula took control of Delhi, prompting Alauddin to send his general Malik Hamiduddin to Delhi. Some days later, Alauddin received the news that Haji Maula had appointed Iltutmish's descendant Alavi as a puppet monarch in Delhi. Alauddin then sent Ulugh Khan to Delhi. By the time Ulugh Khan reached Delhi, Hamiduddin had already quelled the revolt. Ulugh Khan ordered all the surviving rebels to be killed. The grandsons of Haji Maula's former master Fakhruddin were also killed, although they had not played any part in the rebellion.

Alauddin captured the fort in July 1301, and placed it under Ulugh Khan's charge. However, the local public hated Ulugh Khan so much, that he decided not to go beyond the suburbs of Ranthambore.

== Death ==
After his conquest of Ranthambore in 1301, Alauddin ordered Ulugh Khan to prepare for a march to the Kakatiya capital Warangal. Ulugh Khan assembled a large army, but died a few months later.

According to the 14th-century chronicler Ziauddin Barani, his death greatly depressed Alauddin, who gave a lot of money away in charity for the salvation of his soul. However, Barani's contemporary chronicler Isami claims that Alauddin had ordered Ulugh Khan's killing by poisoning. During Alauddin's march to Ranthambore, his nephew Akat Khan made an attempt to assassinate him. When Alauddin fell unconscious, Akat Khan wrongly believed him to be dead, and spread the news. According to Isami's account, a servant of Alauddin told the Sultan that on hearing this news, Ulugh Khan had remarked that he was ready to fill the vacant throne. This made Alauddin suspicious of Ulugh Khan, leading to Ulugh Khan's murder. The 16th-century chronicler Husam Khan, in his Tabaqat-i-Bahadur Shahi, also attributes Ulugh Khan's death to poisoning, a claim repeated by the later chronicler Haji-ud-dabir.

Historian Banarsi Prasad Saksena dismisses Isami's account as false. However, Kishori Saran Lal believes, without citing any evidence, that given Alauddin's temperament, it is not impossible that he had his brother killed.

In 1304, Alauddin sent another army to Gujarat, and annexed it to the Delhi Sultanate. According to Amir Khusrau's Ashiqa, which is of little historical value, Ulugh Khan led this invasion. However, this claim is of doubtful accuracy, and is not supported by other sources. Isami names the commander of the second Gujarat campaign as Malik Jhitam, not Ulugh Khan. The 16th-century historian Firishta also suggests that Ulugh Khan was already dead by this time. The 18th-century text Mirat-i-Ahmadi claims that Ulugh Khan governed Gujarat for 20 years, and was later executed as a result of a conspiracy by Malik Kafur. However, the author has obviously confused Alp Khan with Alauddin's brother Ulugh Khan.

== In popular culture ==
He was portrayed by Ashwin Dhar in Bollywood movie Padmavat which was based on poem of Malik Muhammad Jayasi written on background of Siege of Chittorgarh by Alauddin Khilji.
