= Mongol invasion of India (1297–1298) =

Military expedition of Mongols in India

- Part of Mongol invasions of India
Date	Late 1297 – 6 February 1298
Location	Jaran-Manjur (variously identified as a place in Sindh, a place near Lahore, or Jalandhar)
Result	Delhi Sultanate victory
Territorial changes	Mongol forces expelled from India

Belligerents
Chagatai Khanate	Delhi Sultanate

Commanders and leaders
Kadar	Ulugh Khan; Zafar Khan

Casualties and losses
20,000 killed, several captured (claim by Delhi chronicler Amir Khusrau)	Unknown

In the winter of 1297, Kadar, a noyan of the Mongol Chagatai Khanate invaded the Delhi Sultanate ruled by Alauddin Khalji. The Mongols ravaged the Punjab region of modern-day Pakistan and India, advancing as far as Kasur. Alauddin sent an army led by his brother Ulugh Khan (and probably Zafar Khan) to check their advance. This army defeated the invaders on 6 February 1298, killing around 20,000 of them, and forcing the Mongols to retreat.

== Mongol raids ==
The Mongol Chagatai Khanate had invaded the Delhi Sultanate a number of times, including in 1241, 1245, 1257, and 1285. Alauddin's predecessor Jalaluddin also faced a Mongol invasion, and managed to halt it. During Alauddin's reign, the Mongols invaded India again: compared to the previous invasions, these were large-scale invasions. The first of these invasions was ordered by the Mongol ruler Duwa, who sent his noyan Kadar (or Keder) to India with a 100,000-strong force.

In the winter of 1297-98, Kadar invaded and ravaged the Punjab region of the Delhi Sultanate, which was ruled by Alauddin Khalji. Alauddin's courtier Amir Khusrau mentions that the Mongols reached India by crossing the Sulaiman Mountains. They crossed the major rivers of the Punjab, and burnt the fields of the Khokhar villages. They advanced up to Kasur, where they destroyed houses: according to Khusrau, the light emitted from the burning of the houses could be seen from the suburbs of the city.

== Alauddin's retaliation ==
When Alauddin learned about the havoc caused by the Mongols, he directed his brother and general Ulugh Khan to march against the invaders. According to Ziauddin Barani, Zafar Khan led the Delhi army along with Ulugh Khan, but Alauddin's courtier Amir Khusrau omits Zafar Khan's name. Barani is probably correct. (Zafar Khan's name was omitted in the dynasty's official chronicles because Alauddin was unhappy with his reckless disobedience during the Battle of Kili). According to Khusrau, Ulugh Khan covered the distance of two marches in a single day to face the Mongols. On 6 February 1298, the Delhi army reached Jaran-Manjur, a place located on the banks of the Sutlej River.

According to the contemporary chronicler Amir Khusrau's Dawal Rani, the battle was fought at a place called Jaran Manjur on the banks of the Sutlej River. The name of the place appears as "Jadwa o Manjur" and "Jurat Mahud" in the various manuscripts of Tarikh-i-Firuz Shahi, a work by the near-contemporary chronicler Ziauddin Barani. Henry Miers Elliot, who translated Barani's text into English, identified the site of the battle as modern Jalandhar (which lies to the north-west of the Sutlej river). Firishta (16th century) states that the battle was fought near Lahore, which is located around 130 km from Jalandhar. ʽAbd al-Qadir Badayuni (16th century) names the site as Jaran Manjur. Nizamuddin Ahmad Harawi (17th century) states that the site was located in Sindh.

At the battle site, Ulugh Khan ordered his soldiers to cross the Sutlej River without the boats. According to Khusrau, 20,000 Mongols were killed in the ensuing battle. He boasts that the Mongols "fled like ants and locusts, and were trampled like ants". The wounded among the Mongols were beheaded, and the other survivors were put into chains. The prisoners were brought to Delhi, where they were trampled to death by elephants.

The victory increased Alauddin's prestige, and stabilized his position on the throne of Delhi, which he had ascended recently in 1296.
