= Battle of Kili =

1299 battle fought during Mongol invasions of India

- Part of the Mongol invasions of India
Date	Late 1299
Location	Kili near Delhi 28.65456°N 77.23090°E
Result	Delhi Sultanate victory

Belligerents
Chagatai Khanate	Delhi Sultanate

Commanders and leaders
(Chagatai Khanate) Qutlugh Khwaja (WIA); (Chagatai Khanate) Temür Büqa; (Chagatai Khanate) Hiljak; (Chagatai Khanate) Targhi	(Delhi Sultanate) Alauddin Khalji; (Delhi Sultanate) Zafar Khan †; (Delhi Sultanate) Ulugh Khan; (Delhi Sultanate) Nusrat Khan; (Delhi Sultanate) Akat Khan

Strength
50,000	70,000 cavalry; 700 elephants

Casualties and losses
Unknown	10,000 dead
- Location of Delhi in present-day India

The Battle of Kili was fought in 1299 between the Mongols of the Chagatai Khanate and the Delhi Sultanate. The Mongols, led by Qutlugh Khwaja, invaded India, intending to conquer Delhi and the Indian subcontinent. When they encamped at Kili near Delhi, the Delhi Sultan Alauddin Khalji led an army to check their advance.

Alauddin's general Zafar Khan attacked a Mongol unit led by Hijlak without Alauddin's permission. The Mongols tricked Zafar Khan into following them away from Alauddin's camp, and then ambushed his unit. Before he died, Zafar Khan managed to inflict heavy casualties on the Mongol army. The Mongols decided to retreat after two days.

== Background ==
The Delhi Sultanate was ruled by Alauddin Khalji, who had taken the throne of Delhi after assassinating his uncle in 1296. The Chagatai Khanate controlled Central Asia, and its leader since the 1280s was Duwa Khan who was second in command of Kaidu. Duwa was active in Afghanistan, and attempted to extend Mongol rule into India. Negudari governor Abdullah, who was a son of Chagatai Khan's great grandson, invaded Punjab with his force in 1292, but their advance guard under Ulghu was defeated and taken prisoner by Alauddin's predecessor Jalaluddin Khalji. Around 4,000 Mongol soldiers (called Mughals in Delhi) who surrendered converted to Islam. The suburb they lived in was appropriately named Mughalpura. Chagatai tumens were beaten by the Delhi Sultanate several times in 1296-1297. The Mongols thereafter repeatedly invaded northern India. On at least two occasions, they came in strength.

During Alauddin's reign, the Mongol noyan Kadar raided Punjab in the winter of 1297-98. He was defeated and forced to retreat by Alauddin's general Ulugh Khan. A second Mongol invasion led by Saldi was foiled by Alauddin's general Zafar Khan. After this humiliating defeat, the Mongols launched a third invasion, with full preparations, intending to conquer India.

== Mongol march ==
In late 1299, Duwa, the ruler of the Mongol Chagatai Khanate, dispatched his son Qutlugh Khwaja to conquer Delhi. The Mongols intended to conquer and govern the Delhi Sultanate, not merely raid it. Therefore, during their 6-month long march to India, they did not resort to plundering cities and destroying forts. During the nights, they were harassed by the Delhi generals deployed at frontier posts such as Multan and Samana. The Mongols wanted to conserve their energy for the battle to conquer Delhi, and avoided confrontations with these generals. Alauddin's general Zafar Khan, who was at Kuhram, sent a messenger inviting Qutlugh Khwaja to a battle. However, the invader refused the offer, declaring that "kings only fight kings". He asked Zafar to fight under the banner of his master Alauddin at Delhi.

The Mongols encamped at Kili, around 10 km from the suburbs of Delhi. As the news of their arrival reached the surrounding area, people from the adjoining areas started moving to the safety of the fortified city of Delhi. The streets, the markets, and the mosques of the city became overcrowded. The merchant caravans headed for Delhi were interrupted by the Mongols. As a result, the commodity prices in Delhi increased greatly, causing distress to the local population.

== First encounter ==
Zafar Khan engaged the Mongol army near the Yamuna River but was defeated and forced to retreat toward Delhi. News of the Mongol advance prompted thousands of people from the surrounding regions to flee to the capital, resulting in severe overcrowding and food shortages.

== Alauddin's preparations ==
Alauddin seems to have received the news of Mongol invasion only after the invaders had crossed the Indus River. According to the 14th-century chronicler Isami, he had only 1–2 weeks to prepare for the battle. He immediately sent messages to the various provincial governors, asking them to send reinforcements to Delhi.

Alauddin set up a military camp near Siri, on the banks of the Yamuna River, and summoned his officers. Alaul Mulk, his uncle and the kotwal of Delhi, advised him to resort to diplomacy and negotiations, instead of risking his kingdom. Alauddin rejected the advice, arguing that if he showed weakness, the general public and the warriors will lose respect for him. He publicly announced his intention to march to Kili and fight the Mongols.

Alauddin left Alaul Mulk in charge of Delhi, ordering him to hand over the keys of the palace gates to the victor of the battle. After Alauddin departed for Siri, Alaul Mulk closed all the gates of Delhi except the Badaun Gate. The Badaun Gate was kept open for flight to the Doab, in case of Alauddin's defeat.

== Armies ==
=== Mongol army ===
The 14th century writer Ziauddin Barani gives the strength of the Mongol army as 100,000 at one place in his chronicle, and as 200,000 at another place. Historian Banarsi Prasad Saksena finds this figure doubtful, arguing that it would have been hard for Qutlugh Khwaja to find provisions for such a large army during its journey to India. Historian Alexander Mikaberidze estimates that the Mongol army comprised 100,000 men in the battle.

The Mongol army was organized into four major divisions:

1. The left wing, commanded by Hijlak (or Hajlak)
2. The centre wing, commanded by Qutlugh Khwaja
3. The right wing, commanded by Tamar Bugha
4. A unit of 10,000 soldiers hiding in ambush, commanded by Targhi

Other officers in the Mongol army included Isakilba, Kijya and Utna.

=== Delhi army ===
According to the 16th-century historian Firishta, the Delhi army included 300,000 horses and 2,700 elephants. Historian Kishori Saran Lal finds this figure inflated. Mikaberidze states that the army of Alauddin Khalji in the battle was only 30,000 strong.

The Delhi army was organized into five major divisions:

1. The left wing, commanded by Nusrat Khan
2. The right wing, commanded by Hizabruddin Zafar Khan and supported by the Hindu warriors
3. The centre unit, commanded by Alauddin Khalji
4. A unit commanded by Akat Khan, placed in front of Alauddin's unit
5. A unit commanded by Ulugh Khan, placed at the back of Nusrat Khan's unit for reinforcements

22 elephants were stationed in front of each division to act as a buffer against the Mongol assault.

The Delhi army stretched over several miles, making it difficult for Alauddin to control it centrally. Therefore, he issued a strict order that no officer was to move from their position without his instructions: the punishment for the violation of this order would be beheading.

The 14th century chronicler Isami mentions that before the battle, Qutlugh Khwaja sent four envoys to Alauddin, declaring that such an army was unprecedented in Hindustan. He requested Alauddin to allow his envoys to go around the Delhi army's camp, and inquire the names of his chief officers. Alauddin granted his permission, and the envoys reported back to Qutlugh Khwaja.

== Battle ==
The battle site at Kili was bounded by the Yamuna River on one side, and a bushland on the other.

=== Zafar Khan's death ===
Alauddin had relatively little time to prepare for the battle, and therefore, he wanted to delay the battle. He expected more units to arrive from the east. He also hoped that a delay would cause the already-tired Mongols to fall short of provisions, and retreat. However, Alauddin's general Zafar Khan attacked Hijlak's unit without Alauddin's permission.

Hijlak's unit feigned retreat, which was a common Mongol strategy. Zafar Khan followed the enemy soldiers rapidly, causing his foot soldiers to be left behind. Even his cavalry had trouble keeping up with his pace. After following Hijlak's army for 18 karohs (approximately 55 km), he realized that he had only 1,000 horsemen left with him. Meanwhile, Targhi's Mongol unit had covered an area of 3 km behind him, blocking his return to Alauddin's camp. Alauddin did not send any unit in his support. According to the 17th-century historian Hajiuddabir's Zafarul-vali, Ulugh Khan maintained an ill-will against Zafar Khan, and therefore, did not lead his reinforcement division to support Zafar Khan.

Zafar Khan consulted his officers Usman Akhur-beg, Usman Yaghan, Ali Shah Rana-i-Pil, and others. They realized that they would not be able to return, and even if they did, Alauddin would punish them for not following his orders and for cowardice. Therefore, they decided to die fighting. According to Ziauddin Barani's Tarikh-i-Firuz Shahi, Qutlugh Khwaja offered Zafar an opportunity to surrender, promising to take him to the Chagatai Khanate, where he would be treated more honourably than at the Delhi court. However, Zafar Khan refused this offer.

According to Isami, Zafar Khan and his companions managed to kill 5,000 Mongols, while losing only 800 men. After this, Zafar Khan put up a last stand with his 200 surviving soldiers. After his horse was cut down, he fought on foot, and engaged in hand-to-hand combat with Hijlak. He was killed by an arrow that bypassed his armour and pierced his heart.

=== Mongol retreat ===
Zafar Khan's son Diler Khan also led a charge against the Mongols, forcing Tamar Bugha to fall back. He pursued the retreating Mongol army, whose soldiers showered arrows as they retreated. The Mongols also launched an attack at the centre of the Delhi army, which was repulsed by Alauddin's division, leading to the death of a large number of Mongol soldiers.

Zafar Khan's death had caused despair among the Delhi officers. The next morning, Alauddin's officers advised him to retreat to Delhi, and fight from the security of the fort. Alauddin rejected the advice, arguing that Zafar Khan's troops had suffered because of their disobedience. He declared that if he had to move, he would only move forward. Meanwhile, Qutlugh Khwaja remained reluctant to initiate an attack, and the second day ended without any military action.

The third day also ended without any warfare, and at night, the Mongols retreated towards their homeland. Alauddin allowed them to retreat safely, and then returned to Delhi.

According to Barani, Zafar Khan's attack had caused terror among the Mongols, which was the reason for their retreat. However, modern historian Peter Jackson surmises that Mongols retreated because Qutlugh Khwaja was gravely injured; he died during the return journey.

== Aftermath ==
Although Zafar Khan died fighting in the battle, Alauddin resented the fact that he had disobeyed the royal orders. Nobody in the royal court praised his gallantry; on the contrary, Alauddin denounced his recklessness and disobedience. Zafar Khan's name was omitted in the subsequent royal chronicles written during Alauddin's reign. For example, Amir Khusrau's Khazainul Futuh makes no mention of him.

The Mongols invaded India again in 1303, 1305, and 1306, but failed to defeat the Delhi Sultanate army.
