= Isami =

- Gender: Male

Origin
- Origin: Japanese
- Meaning: Different meanings depending on the kanji used

Isami (written: 勇) is a masculine Japanese given name. Notable people with the name include:

- Isami Doi (1903–1965), American printmaker and painter
- Isami Enomoto (1929-2016), American ceramicist
- Isami Ishii (石井 いさみ; 1941–2022), Japanese manga artist
- Isami Kodaka (木高 イサミ; born 1981), Japanese professional wrestler
- Kondō Isami (近藤 勇) (1834–1868), Japanese swordsman and commander of the Shinsengumi
- Isami Nomura (野村 勇) (born 1996), Japanese professional baseball infielder

== Fictional characters ==
- Isami, a female character from Log Horizon
- Isami Aldini, a character from Food Wars!: Shokugeki no Soma
- Isami Hanaoka, female protagonist from anime and manga series Soar High! Isami
- Isami Minato, a character in the tokusatsu series Ultraman R/B
- Isami Ao, protagonist in the anime Brave Bang Bravern!

== Other uses ==
- Soar High! Isami anime series broadcast by NHK
