= Malik Dinar (general) =

14th century general of the Delhi Sultanate

Malik Dinar was a native Indian slave who served as general in Khalji dynasty of Delhi Sultanate. He served as subordinate officer Malik Kafur and was also a Shihna-yi pil or intendant of elephantry and was sent by Kafur to suppress rebellion in Gujarat. His daughter has been married the third Khalji dynasty sultan, Qutbuddin Mubarak Shah. he was given the title 'Zafar Khan' (literally chief of victory). The very same title which bestowed to one of greatest Khalji military general who repelled the Chagatai Khanate Mongol repeated invasions into India, Zafar Khan Malik Hizbaruddin.
