= Kara-Manikpur =

Subah (province) in Medieval India

Kara-Manikpur was a subah (province) in Medieval India. It consisted of two strongholds: Kara and Manikpur, located on opposite sides of the river Ganges, in what is now the state of Uttar Pradesh.

In the eleventh century, the warrior saint of Islam, Ghazi Saiyyad Salar Masud, defeated the princes of Manikpur and Kara, but Muslim rule was not established till the defeat of Jayachandra by Muhammad Ghori. Manikpur and Kara were important seats of government in the early Muslim period. Alauddin Khalji was governor there, before he gained the throne of Delhi by murdering his uncle on the sands of the river between Manikpur and Kara.

In the fifteenth century, the district came under the rule of the Sharqi kings of Jaunpur and, after its restoration to Delhi, the Rajput chiefs and the Muslim governors were frequently in revolt. The Afghans long retained their hold on the district, and early in the reign of Akbar (mid-16th century), the governor of Manikpur rebelled. In 1580, Akbar reorganized his empire into 12 Subahs and combined the provinces of Jaunpur Sultanate, Kara-Manikpur and territory of Bandhogarh into the Subah of Ilahabad.

It is still called Kara-Manikpur, even though Kara now falls in Kaushambi district, while Manikpur has become a part of Pratapgarh district, Uttar Pradesh.
