= Nusrat Khan Jalesari =

General of Delhi Sultanate

Nusrat Khan
- Died: 10 July 1301 Ranthambore
- Allegiance: Delhi Sultanate
- Branch: Khalji dynasty, Ariz-i-Mumalik
- Service years: 1296–1301
- Conflicts: Alauddin Khalji's raid on Devagiri (1296); Alauddin Khalji's conquest of Multan (1296); Alauddin Khalji's conquest of Gujarat (1299); Battle of Kili (1299); Alauddin Khalji's conquest of Ranthambore (1301)

Nusrat Khan (died 10 July 1301) was a general of the Delhi Sultanate ruler Alauddin Khalji. He served as Alauddin's wazir (prime minister) at the start of his reign, and played an important role in the Sultan's Devagiri (1296) and Gujarat (1299) campaigns. He was killed during the Siege of Ranthambore in 1301.

== Early life ==
Nusrat Khan was also known as Malik Nusrat Jalesari; "Nusrat Khan" was a title given to him by Alauddin. He was an Indian Muslim and the nisba "Jalesari" suggests that he was possibly associated with Jalesar for a long time or hailed from that place. Malik Nusrat Khan married the sister of Alauddin Khalji.

== Career ==
=== Devagiri raid ===
Nusrat Khan became a follower of Alauddin well before the latter's ascension to the throne of Delhi. When Alauddin was a governor of Kara, Nusrat Khan accompanied him during his 1296 raid on Devagiri. Alauddin led an 8,000-strong cavalry, but spread a rumor that his army was only the vanguard of a bigger 20,000-strong cavalry that would reach Devagiri shortly after his arrival. Ramachandra, the king of Devagiri, agreed to negotiate a truce, as his army was away on an expedition under the crown prince Simhana. However, Simhana returned before the truce could be signed, and challenged Alauddin to a battle. Alauddin left a 1,000-strong cavalry under Nusrat Khan in the Devagiri city, and led the rest of his army against Simhana. Alauddin's men were outnumbered and suffered reverses in the battle. When Nusrat Khan heard about this, he left the city without waiting for Alauddin's order, and led his contingent to the battlefield. Simhana's army mistook Nusrat Khan's unit for the rumored 20,000-strong cavalry and fled from the battlefield in panic.

=== Role in Alauddin's rise to power ===
After Alauddin assassinated his predecessor Jalaluddin at Kara in 1296, Nusrat Khan commanded a section of his army during the march to Delhi.

Shortly after his ascension in Delhi, Alauddin sent an army to conquer Multan, which was controlled by Jalaluddin's son Arkali. The army captured Multan, and imprisoned Arkali and other surviving members of Jalaluddin's family. Nusrat Khan met the contingent returning from Multan at Abohar, and meted out severe punishments to the captives in accordance with Alauddin's orders. He blinded Jalaluddin's sons Arkali Khan and Ruknuddin Ibrahim, and later imprisoned them at Hansi. He also blinded their loyal officers Ulghu (or Malik Alghu) and Malik Ahmad Chap, and executed the sons of Arkali Khan. He brought Jalaluddin's widow (the former Malka-i-Jahan) and other women of the harem to Delhi along with Ahmad Chap. These surviving prisoners were kept under surveillance at Nusrat Khan's house in Delhi.

=== As the wazir ===
Alauddin appointed Nusrat Khan as his wazir (prime minister) shortly after the conquest of Multan. Nusrat Khan implemented Alauddin's plan to consolidate power in Delhi by arresting, blinding or killing the aristocrats appointed by Jalaluddin and his predecessors. Nusrat Khan obtained a huge amount of cash for the royal treasury by confiscating their properties. As a result of these measures, Nusrat Khan became very unpopular in Delhi, and Alauddin sent him away by making him the governor of Kara.

=== Gujarat campaign ===
In 1299, Alauddin sent Nusrat Khan and Ulugh Khan to invade Gujarat. The Vaghela king Karna offered a weak resistance, and the two generals ransacked several towns. Nusrat Khan marched as far as the wealthy port city of Khambhat, where he obtained a great amount of wealth from the local merchants and other rich people. There, he also forcibly obtained the slave Malik Kafur, who later led Alauddin's campaigns in Deccan. According to the Jain writer Jinaprabha, Ulugh Khan and Nusrat Khan destroyed hundreds of towns, including Asavalli (near modern Ahmedabad), Vanmanthali and Surat. They also looted several monasteries, palaces and temples. The wealthy Somnath temple which was reconstructed after the Ghaznavid invasion in 1025, was again desecrated.

While returning from Delhi, the generals ordered their soldiers to pay khums (one-fifth of the share of loot). Some of the soldiers tried to conceal the true amount of wealth looted by them, leading to disputes. The generals severely punished some of the soldiers, leading to a mutiny near Jalore, mainly by the Mongol (Mughal) soldiers who had recently converted to Islam. The rebels murdered Nusrat Khan's brother Malik A'izzudin, who was Ulugh Khan's secretary. Ulugh Khan escaped to Nusrat Khan's tent, where the loyal soldiers assembled and forced the rebels to retreat. After suppressing the mutiny, the two generals marched to Delhi. There, Nusrat Khan meted out brutal punishment to the wives and children of the individuals who had murdered his brother A'izzudin. The children were cut into pieces in front of their mothers, who were raped, humiliated and forced into prostitution. These brutal punishments shocked the near-contemporary chronicler Ziauddin Barani, who declared that no religion allowed such acts. According to him, the practice of punishing wives and children for the crimes of men started with this incident in Delhi.

== Last days ==
At the Battle of Kili (1299) against the Mongols, Nusrat Khan commanded the left wing of Alauddin's army. In 1301, Alauddin ordered Ulugh Khan and Nusrat Khan to invade Ranthambore, which was ruled by the Chahamana king Hammiradeva. During the siege, Nusrat Khan was hit by a manjaniq stone, and died 2–3 days later.

Nusrat Khan's nephew Malik Chajju also served Alauddin, and led the failed 1302–1303 Warangal campaign.
