= Siege of Dwarasamudra =

Siege of Hoysala Empire by Delhi Sultanate

- Part of Campaigns of Malik Kafur
| Date | 26–27 February 1311 |
| Location | Dwarasamudra, Hoysala Empire (present-day Halebidu, Karnataka, India) |
| Result | Delhi Sultanate victory |

Belligerents
| Delhi Sultanate | Hoysala Empire |

Commanders and leaders
| Malik Kafur | Veera Ballala III (surrendered) |

Strength
| 10,000 | Unknown |

Casualties and losses
| 0 | Unknown |
- Ballala promised to pay an annual tribute in the future. Kafur agreed to these terms, and thus the siege of Dwarasamudra was lifted without much violence

In late 1310, the Sultan of Delhi Alauddin Khalji sent his slave-general Malik Kafur on an expedition to the southernmost regions of India. In February 1311, Malik Kafur besieged the Hoysala capital Dwarasamudra (present-day Halebidu), and the defending ruler Veera Ballala III surrendered without much resistance. Ballala agreed to pay the Delhi Sultanate an annual tribute, and surrendered a great amount of wealth, elephants and horses.

== Background ==
By 1310, Alauddin Khalji, the Sultan of Delhi controlled large parts of northern India, and had repelled the Mongol invasions. The Yadava and Kakatiya monarchs of Deccan region in southern India were forced to become his tributaries. During the 1310 Siege of Warangal against the Kakatiyas, his slave-general Malik Kafur had learned that the region to the south of the Yadava and Kakatiya kingdoms was also very wealthy. After returning to Delhi, Kafur told Alauddin about this, and expressed his desire to lead an expedition there. Alauddin readily agreed to the proposal. His motive appears to have been plundering, although his courtier Amir Khusrau says that the objective of the expedition was to "spread the light of shariat" in the South.

== March to the Hoysala kingdom ==
Delhi and Dwarasamudra in present-day India

On 17 November 1310, the Delhi army led by Malik Kafur marched from Delhi with Alauddin's symbol, the royal canopy. Their first stop was Tankal, a village located on the banks of the Yamuna River; the modern identity of this place is uncertain. Here, the minister of war Khwaja Haji held a review of the army over the next 14 days. The army left Tankal on 2 December 1310, and reached a place called Katihun in 21 stages. The modern identity of this place is also uncertain.

After leaving Katihun, the Delhi army crossed hills, valleys and three rivers, the largest of which was Narmada. After 17 days, it reached a place called Ghargaon, which can be identified with modern Khargone. Here, the Delhi generals encamped for 20 days during which they conducted a second review of the army. In addition, the army was reinforced with 23 elephants sent by the Kakatiya king Prataparudra.

The Delhi army resumed its march on 29 January 1311, and after crossing the Tapti River, reached the Yadava capital Devagiri on 3 February 1311. The Yadava ruler Ramachandra had decorated the city to welcome the army, and had made arrangements to facilitate their onward march. He had ensured that all of the army's necessities, including a variety of clothes and fruits, were available at the local bazaars (markets), at a fair price. He had also arranged for a number of money changers (sarrafs) with gold and silver tankas (coins). Khusrau says that the Muslim soldiers of the Delhi army and the local Hindus interacted peacefully.

After arranging itself in formations and replenishing its stocks at Devagiri, the Delhi army left Devagiri on 7 February 1311. Over the next 5 days, it crossed three rivers: Godavari, Sini (Sina), and Pahnur (or Binhur, identified with Bhima). It halted at Bandri (identified with Pandharpur), the fief of Ramachandra's general Parasuram Deva, who had been instructed by his master to support the Delhi army. With Parasuram's assistance, Malik Kafur learned the following details: Taking advantage of a fight between the Pandya brothers Vira and Sundara, the Hoysala monarch Veera Ballala III had left his capital to plunder cities in the Pandya territory. However, after learning about the Delhi army's presence in the Deccan, he had decided to return to his capital.

== Siege and surrender ==
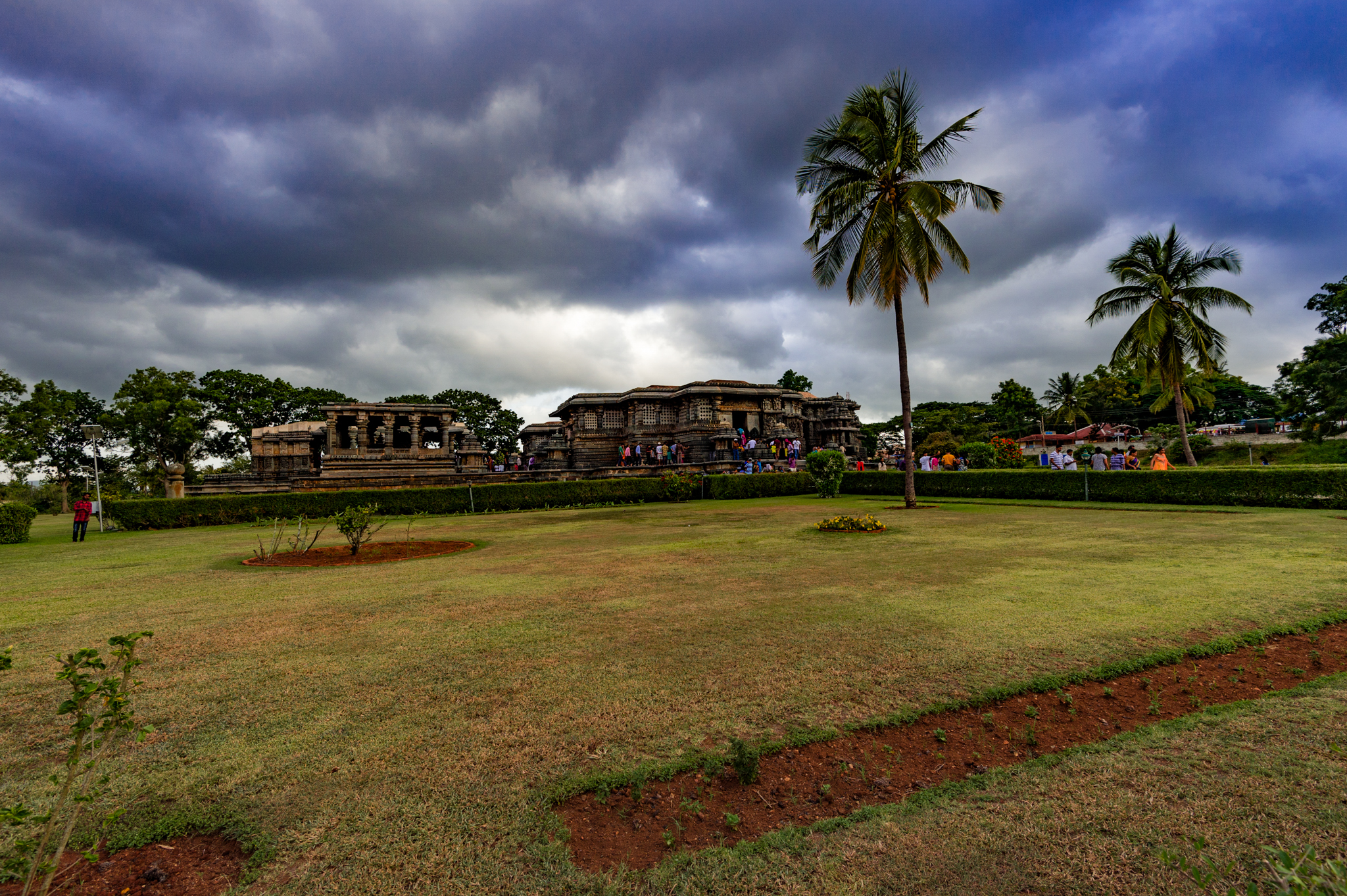
Ruins of Dwarasamudra, now known as Halebidu

The Hoysala monarch Veera Ballala III had returned to his capital Dwarasamudra in a hurry, and had little time to make adequate preparations for the impending onslaught from the Delhi army. The Delhi generals wanted to take advantage of this, but it was not possible for the entire Sultanate army to reach Dwarasamudra in a short time. So, Malik Kafur selected 10,000 soldiers and marched with them to Dwarasamudra on 14 February 1311.

After a 12-day journey, Malik Kafur reached Dwarasamudra on 26 February 1311, and besieged the local fort, which Amir Khusrau describes as a strong fort surrounded by a water body. Ballala's advisors urged him to put up a fight, fearing that negotiating a truce would irreparably damage the kingdom's prestige. However, Ballala did not engage in any conflict other than minor skirmishes. One night, he sent an officer named Gesu Mal (or Gaisu Mal) to collect information about the invading army, and learned that it had subdued other monarchs like Ramachandra and Prataparudra. He also learned that the invaders intended to attack his fort on the next day.

The next morning, Ballala sent Balak Deva Nayaka and other envoys out of the fort, and requested a truce. According to Khusrau, Malik Kafur offered the following terms to the Hoysalas: they could accept Islam, or they could pay a tribute (zimmah). If they accepted neither of these choices, they would be killed. Ballala chose to pay the tribute.

Ballala's messengers requested Malik Kafur to send two envoys to their king, so that the terms of the truce could be finalized without any misunderstanding. Malik Kafur obliged, and sent two Hindu messengers inside the fort. Ballala told these messengers that he was ready to surrender all his belongings except his sacred thread, which was an important symbol of his Hindu identity. He also promised to pay an annual tribute in the future. Kafur agreed to these terms, and thus the siege of Dwarasamudra was lifted without much violence.

On the same day, Ballala sent his envoys Balak Deva Nayak, Main Deva, Jitmal and others outside the fort. The envoys bowed to Alauddin's royal canopy, and offered 36 elephants. Four days later, Ballala surrendered his horses. A few days later, he himself came out of the fort, bowed before the royal canopy, and surrendered his treasures.

== Aftermath ==
Malik Kafur halted at Dwarasamudra for 12 days, for the rest of his army to catch up. He left Dwarasamudra for the Pandya kingdom on 10 March 1311. The 14th century chronicler Isami states that Ballala guided the Delhi army during the plunder of the Pandya territories, and later, visited Delhi. According to this narrative, Alauddin was very pleased with Ballala's loyalty and assistance in the raid of the Pandya territory. He gave the Hoysala king a robe of honour, a crown, a chhatr, a gift of 1 million tankahs (coins). Historian Banarsi Prasad Saksena doubts this claim, as it does not appear in the writings of the contemporary Delhi courtier Amir Khusrau. However, according to historian Kishori Saran Lal, Ballala's visit to Delhi is corroborated by an inscription which states that the Hoysala king returned from Delhi on 6 May 1313.
