= Ali Beg (Chagatai commander) =

Mongol military commander

- علی بیگ
- Born: Unknown
- Died: 1305; Delhi, Delhi Sultanate
- Cause of death: Executed by elephant trampling
- Relatives: Served under Duwa (Chagatai Khan)
- Military career
- Allegiance: Chagatai Khanate
- Service years: c. 1300–1305
- Rank: Amir (commander)
- Commands: Chagatai invasion force (1305)
- Conflicts: Mongol invasions of India; Battle of Amroha / Ravi River (1305)
- Religion: Islam

Ali Beg was a Mongol military commander (amir) of the Chagatai Khanate who led a major invasion of the Delhi Sultanate during the reign of Alauddin Khalji. In 1305, he and his co-commander Tartaq crossed the Indus River with a large army but were decisively defeated by Delhi's forces near Amroha (or the Ravi River). He was captured after the battle, Ali Beg was taken to Delhi and publicly executed by |elephant trampling. His campaign was the last major Mongol incursions into the Indian subcontinent.

The Delhi chronicler Ziauddin Barani describes Ali Beg as a descendant of Genghis Khan, but Ali Beg actually belonged to the Khongirad tribe. He was married to a Chinggisid princess, who was a descendant of Genghis Khan through Ögedei Khan.

The Mongol commanders Ali Beg and Tartaq, who had surrendered, were presented before Alauddin with other Mongol prisoners. According to Amir Khusrau, Alauddin ordered some of the captives to be killed, and others to be imprisoned. However, Barani states that Alauddin ordered all captives to be killed by having them trampled under elephants' feet.

Amir Khusrau and another chronicler Isami state that Alauddin spared the lives of Ali Beg and Tartaq (probably because of their high ranks). According to Amir Khusrau, one of these commanders died "without any harm being done to him", and the other was "left alone". He ambiguously adds that Alauddin "was so successful in sport that he took their lives in one game after another". According to Isami, Alauddin made the two Mongol commanders Amirs (officials with high status), and also gave each of them an India-born slave girl. Two months later, Tartaq started demanding answers about the fate of his army and his belongings, in a state of drunken stupor. As a result, Alauddin ordered him to be killed. Sometime later, Ali Beg was also killed because of "the evil in his heart".

Historian Peter Jackson speculates that Ali Beg and Tartaq might have been killed when a large number of Mongols in Delhi rebelled against Alauddin, prompting the Sultan to order a massacre of all the Mongols in his empire.

Isami states that after being defeated and imprisoned, they had been recruited into Alauddin's service (probably because of their high ranks), but they were later killed on Alauddin's orders.

== See also ==
- Mongol invasions of India
- Battle of Amroha
- Chagatai Khanate
