= Veera Ballala IV =

Hoysala king from 1343 to 1346

- Veera

Hoysala king
- Reign: 28 June 1343 – 1346
- Coronation: 11 August 1343; Dwarasamudra
- Predecessor: Veera Ballala III
- Successor: Position disestablished Vira Harihara Raya (as Emperor of Vijayanagara)
- Dynasty: Hoysala
- Father: Veera Ballala III

Veera Ballala IV was the last Hoysala king from 1343 until his death in 1346. He was the eldest son and successor of the powerful Hoysala emperor Veera Ballala III. He resided over a declining Hoysala kingdom, and was in constant war with the Turko-Persian Madurai Sultanate and an upcoming Vijayanagara Empire.

== Early life ==
Veera Virupaksha Ballala was born to the Hoysala monarch Veera Ballala III and his wife. Dwarasamudra, the Hoysala capital was attacked and plundered in 1311. Veera Ballala III, his father had to accept defeat to the Turko-Persian Sultan Alauddin Khilji, pay a handsome tribute, and send Virupaksha to Delhi as an act of submission. He returned in 1313.

== Reign ==
Veera Ballala IV resided over a declining Hoysala kingdom, and was in constant war with the Turko-Persian Madurai Sultanate and an upcoming Vijayanagara Empire. He was unable to check the advance of the Sangama brothers of Vijayanagara. (Harihara, Bukka, Kampa I, Marappa and Muddappa). It did not help that Virupaksha Ballala was an incompetent ruler. All the several chiefs, who had served his capable father Veera Ballala III, now took advantage of Virupaksha Ballala's weakness, grabbed the opportunity and started declaring their independence. The finest Hoysala soldiers had been killed in the war against Turko-Persian Sultan of Madurai. He had given away his entire treasure to Ghiyas-ud-din, the Turko-Persian Sultan of Madurai in the vain hope of releasing his father. Even his general and cousin Ballappa Dandanayaka, who had served him and his father Veera Ballala III loyally now deserted him. In spite of all these difficulties, he still put up a stiff resistance and it was only after a continuous struggle of 6 years (A.D. 1346) that the Vijayanagara rulers were able to conquer the whole of the Hoysala kingdom.

The Kadambas, who were ruling over Banavasi, on the coast of Konkan gave shelter to Virupaksha Ballala. To defeat them, Harihara sent his brother Marappa. The latter defeated the Kadamba ruler and annexed his territory.

== Death ==
Veera Ballala IV was captured in a battle fought against the Turko-Persian Madurai Sultanate. He was flayed and then slain, just as his father was. This happened in c. 1346. This was the end of the rule of the Hoysalas.

== Bibliography ==
- A history of the Delhi Sultanate, Vikramjeet Chaturvedi, Hachette India, 1995
- The Hoysalas, J. Duncan M. Derret, Oxford University Press, 1957
- Sastri, K.A. Nilakanta (2002) [1955]. A history of South India from prehistoric times to the fall of Vijayanagar. New Delhi: Indian Branch, Oxford University Press. ISBN 0-19-560686-8.
- Keay, John (2000) [2000]. India: A History. New York: Grove Publications. ISBN 0-8021-3797-0.
- Chopra, P.N.; Ravindran, T.K.; Subrahmanian, N (2003) [2003]. History of South India (Ancient, Medieval and Modern) Part 1. New Delhi: Chand Publications. ISBN 81-219-0153-7.
- Kamath, Suryanath U. (2001) [1980]. A concise history of Karnataka: from pre-historic times to the present. Bangalore: Jupiter books. LCCN 80905179. OCLC 7796041.
