= Malik Kafur =

General of Delhi Sultanate

Malik Kāfūr
- Died: c. 11 February 1316; Delhi
- Other names: Tāj al-Dīn 'Izz al-Dawla, Malik Nā'ib, Hazār-Dīnārī, al-Alfī
- Military career
- Allegiance: Delhi Sultanate
- Rank: Na'ib (viceroy)
- Conflicts: Mongol invasion (1306); Siege of Devagiri (1308); Siege of Warangal (1310); Siege of Dwarasamudra (1311); Pandya kingdom raids (1311)

Malik Kafur (died c. 11 February 1316), also known as Taj al-Din Izz al-Dawla, was a prominent general of the Delhi Sultanate ruler Alauddin Khalji. He was captured by Alauddin's general Nusrat Khan during the 1299 invasion of Gujarat, and rose to prominence around 1305.

As a commander of Alauddin's forces, Kafur defeated the Mongol invaders in 1306. Subsequently, he led a series of expeditions in the southern part of India, against the Yadavas (1308), the Kakatiyas (1310), the Hoysalas (1311), and the Pandyas (1311). From these campaigns, he brought back many treasures, and many elephants and horses for the Delhi Sultanate.

From 1313 to 1315, Kafur served as Alauddin's governor of Devagiri. When Alauddin fell seriously ill in 1315, Kafur was recalled to Delhi, where he exercised power as Na'ib (viceroy). After Alauddin's death, he tried to usurp control by appointing Alauddin's minor son, Shihabuddin Omar, as a puppet monarch. Kafur's regency lasted for about a month, before he was assassinated by Alauddin's former bodyguards. Alauddin's elder son, Mubarak Shah, succeeded him as regent, and usurped power shortly afterward.

== Early life and career ==
Kafur is described as of Hindu descent ("Mahratta", according to the 14th-century chronicler Isami). In his youth, Kafur was the slave of a wealthy Khwaja of Khambhat. He was an eunuch slave of great physical beauty, said to have been purchased by his original master for 1,000 dinars. This resulted in the epithet hazar-dinari. It is very unlikely that the price paid was actually 1,000 dinars; the description seems rather to be a metaphorical compliment to Kafur. Ibn Batuta (1304–1369) refers to Kafur by the epithet al-Alfi (the Arabic equivalent of hazar-dinari), again in reference to the price paid for him, but Ibn Batuta may be in error in stating that the epithet refers to a sum paid by the sultan (Alauddin) himself for Kafur.

Kafur was captured from the port city of Khambhat by Alauddin's general Nusrat Khan, during the 1299 invasion of Gujarat, and converted to Islam. Nusrat Khan presented him to Alauddin in Delhi. Nothing is known about Kafur's early career in Alauddin's service. According to Isami, Alauddin favoured Kafur because "his counsel had always proved appropriate and fit for the occasion". Kafur rose rapidly, mainly because of his proven ability as a wise counsellor and military commander. By 1306, Kafur held the rank of barbeg, used to designate a chamberlain who also served as a military commander. By 1309–1310, he held the iqta' (administrative grant) of Rapri.

== Military career ==
Khalji territory (dark green) after annexation of the Sevuna (Yadava) kingdom of Devagiri, showing capital Delhi (star) and territories of the Khalji tributaries (light green)

In 1306, Alauddin sent an army led by Kafur to the Punjab to repulse a Mongol invasion by the Chagatai Khanate. The Mongol army had advanced to the Ravi River, ransacking the territories along the way. This army included three contingents, led by Kopek, Iqbalmand, and Tai-Bu. Kafur routed the Mongol army, with support from other commanders, including Malik Tughluq. Kafur was known by this time as Na'ib-i Barbak ("assistant master of ceremonies"). This may be the origin of his name Malik Na'ib, although some historians believe this relates instead to his later, and more important, role of Na'ib-i Sultan.

The 16th-century chronicler `Abd al-Qadir Bada'uni also credits Kafur with leading Alauddin's army in the 1305 Battle of Amroha. This claim, however, is based on the erroneous identification of another officer, called Malik Nayak (a.k.a. Malik Nanak), with Malik Kafur.

Kafur was then sent to the Deccan Plateau, as the commander of a series of great military raids that laid the foundations of Muslim power in that region. In 1307, Alauddin decided to invade the Yadava kingdom of Devagiri, whose king, Ramachandra, had discontinued tribute payments to Delhi for three or four years. Alauddin had originally intended to select another slave to lead this invasion: Malik Shahin, who was the governor of Chittor Fort. But Malik Shahin had fled, fearing a Vaghela resurgence in the neighbouring territory of Gujarat. Alauddin appointed Kafur instead.

Alauddin took measures to raise Kafur above all other officers. The royal canopy and the royal pavilion were sent with Kafur, and the officers were directed to pay their respects to Kafur daily and to take their orders from him. Kafur easily subjugated the Yadavas. Along with rich spoils, Kafur brought Ramachandra back to Delhi, where the Yadava king acknowledged Alauddin's suzerainty.

In 1309, Alauddin sent Kafur on an expedition to the Kakatiya kingdom. Kafur's army reached the Kakatiya capital, Warangal, in January 1310, and breached its outer fort after a month-long siege. The Kakatiya ruler, Prataparudra, surrendered and agreed to pay tribute. Kafur returned to Delhi in June 1310 with a huge amount of wealth obtained from the defeated king. The Koh-i-Noor diamond was said to be among the loot. Alauddin was very pleased with Kafur, and rewarded him generously.

In Warangal, Kafur had learned that the southernmost regions of India were also very wealthy. He obtained Alauddin's permission to lead an expedition there. The expedition set off on 19 October 1310, and reached the extremity of peninsular India. On 25 February 1311, Kafur besieged Dwarasamudra, the Hoysala capital, with 10,000 soldiers. The Hoysala king, Ballala, surrendered vast wealth as part of a truce negotiation, and agreed to pay an annual tribute to the Delhi Sultanate. From Dwarasamudra, Kafur proceeded to the Pandya kingdom, where he raided several places, obtaining much treasure, elephants and horses. Kafur occupied Madurai on 24 April, and reached Delhi in triumph on 18 October 1311.

At court, Kafur seems to have excited the enmity of a faction led by Mahru, Alauddin's second wife; Khizr Khan, his eldest son by her; and Alp Khan, Mahru's brother, who was also Khizr Khan's father-in-law and the governor of Gujarat. In 1313, probably at his own request, Kafur led another expedition to Devagiri, when Ramachandra's successor Singhana (or Shankaradeva) refused to continue the tribute payments. Kafur subdued him, and annexed Devagiri to the Delhi Sultanate. Kafur remained in Devagiri as governor of the newly annexed territory for two years, until he was urgently summoned to Delhi when Alauddin's health began deteriorating. He had administered the territory with sympathy and efficiency.

== As viceroy ==
Kafur ultimately rose to the position of Na'ib (viceroy), although the date of his appointment to this position is not known. In 1315, when Alauddin fell seriously ill, Kafur was recalled from Devagiri to Delhi. Kafur handed over charge of Devagiri to Ayn al-Mulk Multani.

During Alauddin's last days, Kafur held the executive power. During this period, Alauddin became very distrustful of his other officers, and started concentrating power in the hands of his family and his slaves. He removed several experienced administrators, abolished the office of wazir (prime minister), and even executed the minister Sharaf Qa'ini. It appears that Kafur, who considered these officers his rivals and a threat, convinced Alauddin to carry out this purge. Alauddin had greater trust in Kafur than other officers because, unlike the other officers, Kafur had no family or followers. According to Isami, during the final days of Alauddin's reign, Kafur allowed no one to see the sultan, and became de facto ruler of the Sultanate.

=== Relationship with Alauddin ===
Kafur had been captured by Khalji forces in 1299, and had caught the fancy of Alauddin. A deep emotional bond developed between the two. During his reign (even before his illness), Alauddin was infatuated with Kafur, distinguishing him above all his other friends and helpers, and Kafur held the highest place in his esteem. Regarding the time when Alauddin was ill, the chronicler Ziauddin Barani (1285–1357) states:

In those four or five years when the Sultan was losing his memory and his senses, he had fallen deeply and madly in love with the Malik Naib. He had entrusted the responsibility of the government and the control of the servants to this useless, ungrateful, ingratiate, sodomite.

— Barani

Based on Barani's description, several scholars including Ruth Vanita and Saleem Kidwai among others believe that Alauddin and Kafur were in a homosexual relationship. Historian Banarsi Prasad Saksena states that Alauddin was infatuated with Kafur during the last years of his reign, but believes that the closeness between the two was not sexual.

=== Murder of Alp Khan ===
Kafur's hold on power was threatened by Alp Khan, an influential noble whose two daughters were married to Alauddin's sons, Khizr Khan (the heir apparent) and Shadi Khan. Kafur convinced Alauddin to order the killing of Alp Khan in the royal palace. He also had Khizr Khan first banished from court to Amroha, and then imprisoned in Gwalior, and had Khizr's brother Shadi Khan imprisoned. According to stories that circulated as far as Persia, Khizr Khan, his mother and Alp Khan had hatched a conspiracy to poison Alauddin, so that Khizr Khan could be appointed as the new Sultan, but Alauddin was able to execute them all before he died. This story was corroborated to some extent by Ibn Battuta. The story may just have been Kafur's propaganda.

Next, Kafur convened a meeting of important officers at Alauddin's bedside. At this meeting, Alauddin's six-year-old son Shihabuddin was declared the new heir apparent, and it was decided that Kafur would act as his regent after Alauddin's death. According to Isami, Alauddin was too weak to speak during the meeting, but his silence was taken as consent.

The officers supportive of Kafur included Kamal al-Din "Gurg", whose family came from Kabul. It appears that Kafur and other officers of non-Turkic origin allied to counter the Khalaj establishment of the Sultanate.

== As regent ==
The last act of Malik Naib Kafur, 1316 CE., 20th century artist's impression

When Alauddin died, on the night of 4 January 1316, Kafur brought his body from the Siri Palace and had it buried in the mausoleum that had been built before Alauddin's death. Barani claims that, according to "some people", Kafur murdered Alauddin.

The day after Alauddin's death, Kafur convened a meeting of important officers and nobles in the palace. There, he read out a will of the late sultan that named Shihabuddin as his successor while disinheriting Khizr Khan, and then seated Shihabuddin on the throne as the new Sultan. As regent, Kafur held power for a short time—35 days, according to Barani; 1 month, according to Isami; and 25 days, according to the 16th-century historian Firishta. During this period, he held a daily ceremonial court in the morning at the Hazar Sutun Palace. After the short ceremony, Kafur would send Shihabuddin to his mother, and dismiss the courtiers. He would then meet the officers in his chambers on the ground floor, and issue various orders. He ordered the ministries of revenue, secretariat, war, and commerce to maintain the laws and regulations established by Alauddin. The officers of the ministries were asked to consult Kafur on all policy matters.

Kafur took several actions to maintain his control over the throne. Before burying Alauddin, he had taken the royal ring from the Sultan's finger. He gave this ring to his general, Sumbul, and asked him to march to Gwalior and take control of the fort, using the ring as a symbol of royal authority. He asked Sumbul to send the fort's governor to Delhi, and ordered Sumbul to return to Delhi after blinding Khizr Khan, who had been imprisoned in Gwalior. Sumbul carried out these orders, and was appointed Amir-i Hijab(Commander of the Faithful) as a reward. On his first day as regent, Kafur also ordered his barber to blind Khizr Khan's uterine brother Shadi Khan. This incident intensified resentment of Kafur among the Turkic nobles. Kafur deprived Alauddin's senior queen, who bore the title Malika-i Jahan, of all her property, and later imprisoned her at Gwalior fort. He also imprisoned Mubarak Shah, another adult son of Alauddin. According to Firishta, Kafur married Alauddin's widow Jhatyapalli, the mother of Shihabuddin. Becoming the new Sultan's step-father was probably Kafur's way of legitimizing his power.

Alp Khan's murder had led to a rebellion in Gujarat, and Kafur had sent Kamal al-Din "Gurg" to suppress it. Meanwhile, Kafur summoned the Devagiri governor, Ayn al-Mulk Multani, to Delhi with all his soldiers. While Multani was on his way, Kamal al-Din was killed in Gujarat. Kafur then appointed Multani as governor of Gujarat, and asked him to march there to suppress the rebellion. The rebellion could be suppressed only after Kafur's death.

== Death ==
Alauddin's former bodyguards (paiks) disapproved of Kafur's actions against the family of their deceased master. Led by Mubashshir, Bashir, Saleh, and Munir, these bodyguards decided to kill Kafur. When Kafur became suspicious of a conspiracy against him, he summoned Mubashshir to his room. Mubashshir, who had been permitted to carry arms in the royal quarters since Alauddin's day, wounded Kafur with his sword. His associates then entered the room and beheaded Kafur, also killing two or three gatekeepers who had attempted to protect him. This event took place sometime in February 1316; if Barani and Isami are right in stating that Kafur ruled for 35 days, his death can be dated to 11 February 1316.

According to an account cited by the 16th-century chronicler Firishta, Kafur had sent some paiks to blind Mubarak Shah, but the captive prince gave them his jeweled necklace and convinced them to kill Kafur instead. Another legend attributes Kafur's death to his mother's prayers to the mystic Shaikhzada Jam. These accounts are latter-day fabrications. According to Barani's near-contemporary account, the paiks decided to kill Kafur on their own initiative.

Kafur's killers freed Mubarak Shah, who was appointed as the new regent. A few months later, Mubarak Shah usurped control by blinding Shihabuddin. Kafur's killers claimed credit for making him king, and began demanding high positions in the royal court. Instead, Mubarak Shah had them executed.

The chronicler Barani was severely critical of Kafur. Historian Abraham Eraly, however, believes that Barani's criticism of Kafur is not credible as Barani was deeply prejudiced against Kafur, presumably because of Kafur's non-Turkic, Hindu origins and eunuch status.

=== Tomb ===
The location of Kafur's grave is unknown today. His mausoleum existed in the 14th century, when it was repaired by Sultan Firuz Shah Tughlaq (r. 1351–1388). Firuz Shah's autobiography Futuhat-i-Firuzshahi states:

Tomb of Malik Taj-ul-Mulk Kafur, the great wazir of Sultan Ala-ud-din. He was a most wise and intelligent minister, and acquired many countries, on which the horses of former sovereigns had never placed their hoofs, and he caused the Khutba of Sultan Ala-ud-din to be repeated there. He had 52,000 horsemen. His grave had been levelled with the ground, and his tomb laid low. I caused his tomb to be entirely renewed, for he was a devoted and faithful subject.

== Popular culture ==
=== Films and television ===
- In the 1963 Indian Tamil-language historical drama film Chitor Rani Padmini Kafur is portrayed by M. N. Nambiar.
- In the 2018 Bollywood film Padmaavat, Malik Kafur is portrayed by Jim Sarbh.
