= Siege of Warangal (1310) =

1310 siege in India

Date	19 January – 16 February 1310 (4 weeks)
Location	Warangal
Result	Delhi Sultanate victory

Belligerents
Kakatiya dynasty	Delhi Sultanate

Commanders and leaders
Prataparudra (surrendered)	Malik Kafur

Delhi and Warangal in present-day India

In late 1309, the Delhi Sultanate ruler Alauddin Khalji sent his general Malik Kafur on an expedition to the Kakatiya capital Warangal. Malik Kafur reached Warangal in January 1310, after conquering a fort on the Kakatiya frontier and ransacking their territory. After a month-long siege, the Kakatiya ruler Prataparudra decided to negotiate a truce, and surrendered a huge amount of wealth to the Delhi Sultanate, besides promising to send annual tributes to Delhi.

== Background ==
In the early 13th century, the Deccan region of southern India was an immensely wealthy area, having been shielded from the foreign armies that had ransacked northern India. The Kakatiya dynasty ruled the eastern part of the Deccan, with their capital at Warangal. In 1296, before Alauddin ascended the throne of Delhi, he had raided Devagiri, the capital of the Kakatiyas' neighbours the Yadavas. The immense plunder obtained from Devagiri prompted him to plan an invasion of Warangal. After his conquest of Ranthambore in 1301, Alauddin had ordered his general Ulugh Khan to prepare for a march to Warangal, but Ulugh Khan's untimely death put an end to this plan.

=== 1302-1303 expedition ===
In late 1302 or early 1303, Alauddin himself marched to Chittor, and dispatched another army to Warangal. The army headed to Warangal was led by Malik Juna (or Jauna) and Malik Chajju (or Jhujhu). Malik Juna (Senior) was the son of Ghazi Malik, and held the office of dadbek-i-hazrat. Malik Chajju was a nephew of Alauddin's late general Nusrat Khan, and the governor of Kara.

This Warangal campaign of 1302-1303 ended in disaster, as attested by multiple medieval chroniclers. By the time this army returned close to Delhi in the winter of 1303, it had suffered severe losses in terms of men and baggage, and was unable to enter Delhi to help Alauddin fight against the Mongols, who had besieged Delhi.

According to the 14th century chronicler Ziauddin Barani, this Delhi army had managed to reach Warangal, but decided to return because the rainy season had started. The 16th century chronicler Firishta states that this army was ordered to reach Warangal via Bengal, even though a shorter route passed through central India. Historian Banarsi Prasad Saksena suggests that this decision might have been taken because Alauddin had not yet conquered the Malwa region in central India. However, historian Kishori Saran Lal theorizes that Alauddin wanted to conquer Bengal, which had been a part of the Delhi Sultanate under the Mamluk dynasty, but had since become independent. Firishta simply states the Delhi army returned "confused and shattered without accomplishing anything": his writings do not clarify whether the army reached Warangal or not. Lal speculates that the Delhi army met with a humiliating defeat in Bengal, which was ruled by Shamsuddin Firoz. He theorizes that an embarrassed Alauddin decided to keep this failure a secret, which explains Barani's narrative. On the other hand, P. V. P. Sastry believes that a Kakatiya army repulsed the invaders at Upparapalli, based on Velugoṭivāri-Vamṣavāli, which states that two Kakatiya commanders destroyed the pride of the Turushkas (Turkic people).

== Malik Kafur's march to Warangal ==
In 1308, Malik Kafur had defeated the Yadavas, the neighbours of the Kakatiyas, and the Yadava king Ramachandra had become a vassal of Alauddin. According to the Delhi courtier Amir Khusrau, Alauddin ordered Malik Kafur to invade the Kakatiya kingdom on 31 October 1309.

As the Kakatiya territory was unfamiliar to the Delhi forces, Alauddin recommended lenient treatment of the troops, so as to avoid any resentment or revolt. He instructed Malik Kafur to cooperate closely with the officers such as Malik Sirajuddin and Ariz-i-Mumalik. He asked Kafur to respect the other commanders in the Delhi forces, but also cautioned him not to become too gentle which would make them disobedient. He advised Kafur not to remain in Kakatiya territory for long, and to accept a tribute from Prataparudra instead of bringing him to Delhi as a prisoner.

Alauddin made arrangements for rapid communication of news about the expedition by establishing thanas (posts) all along the route from Tilpat near Delhi to the army's current position. At every post and town along the route, fast-running horses and news-writers were stationed. Along the roads, foot-runners were stationed at regular distances to carry messages. This arrangement ensured that Alauddin was updated about the army's situation every alternate 2–3 days. It also ensured that the army was immune from any false rumors about the happenings in Delhi.

Malik Kafur started his march from Delhi to Warangal with a huge army. He first visited his own fief of Rewari, and then continued his journey southwards. Nine days after starting its march, the army encamped at a place, whose modern identity is unknown. This place was either called Masudpur, or known after Masud, a son of Iltutmish. The army resumed its march on 13 November 1309, passing through a difficult terrain. Over the next 6 days, the army crossed five rivers at fords: Jun (identified as a small tributary of Yamuna); Chambal; Binas (identified with Banas, Kali Sindh or its tributary Niwaj); Kwari; and Bhoji (identified with Betwa or Pahuj).

According to Amir Khusrau, Malik Kafur halted at a place called Sultanpur (also known as Irajpur) for four days. The modern identity of this place is not certain. Barani mentions that several amirs met Kafur at Chanderi, but Amir Khusrau does not mention Chanderi at all. Therefore, historian Banarsi Prasad Saksena suggests that Irajpur might be Irich near Chanderi.

Kafur resumed his march on 25 November 1309, marching on a stony road. On 5 December 1309, he reached Khandar, whose modern identity is also uncertain. Here, he halted for 14 days to conduct a thorough review of the army. After resuming its march, the army crossed the Narmada River. Eight days later, the army reached Nilkanth, a place located within the frontier region of the Yadava kingdom. As the Yadava king was now a vassal of Alauddin, the army was instructed not to ransack the area. During the two-day halt at Nilkanth, Kafur made inquiries about the road ahead. He resumed his march on 30 December 1309.

In Devagiri, Ramachandra provided the necessary support to the Delhi army. On the route connecting Devagiri to Warangal, he established markets, where Malik Kafur's soldiers could buy things at the rates fixed by Alauddin. He also reinforced the Delhi army with his own troops, and even escorted Malik Kafur for some distance.

According to Khusrau, before entering the Kakatiya territory, the Delhi army halted at Bavagarh (misread as "Basiragarh" or "Bijainagar" by some translators). This place was located in a doab between the rivers Basihar (also Yashr or Bihar) and Baragi (or Buji), close to a diamond mine. It has been identified with modern Wairagarh in Gadchiroli district; the names of the rivers in Khusrau's writings appear to be corrupt: at least one of them must be Wainganga or one of its tributaries.

== Fall of Sabar ==
After entering the Kakatiya territory, Malik Kafur started ransacking the towns and villages on his way to Warangal.

The same day Malik Kafur reached Bavagarh, he led a cavalry unit to besiege Sabar, a fort located within the Kakatiya frontier region. Historian Kishori Saran Lal identifies Sabar with modern Sirpur. Khusrau's account suggests that this was a surprise attack for the defenders: faced with a certain defeat, some of them committed suicide with their wives and children in a jauhar fire. Some others, probably including the fort's commander, were killed after Kafur's soldiers entered the fort. The surviving defenders were ready to fight to death, but then a truce was negotiated because of intervention by Khwaja Haji. Ananir (or Ananur), a brother of the fort's commander, was found hiding in a field. He surrendered to the invaders, and was appointed as the fort's new governor by Malik Kafur. Some of the refugees from Sabar fled to Warangal.

The various Kakatiya feudatories marched to Warangal, instead of intercepting the Delhi army on the route leading to Warangal. This made Malik Kafur's job easier, as he had to now besiege just one fort: that of Warangal.

== Warangal besieged ==
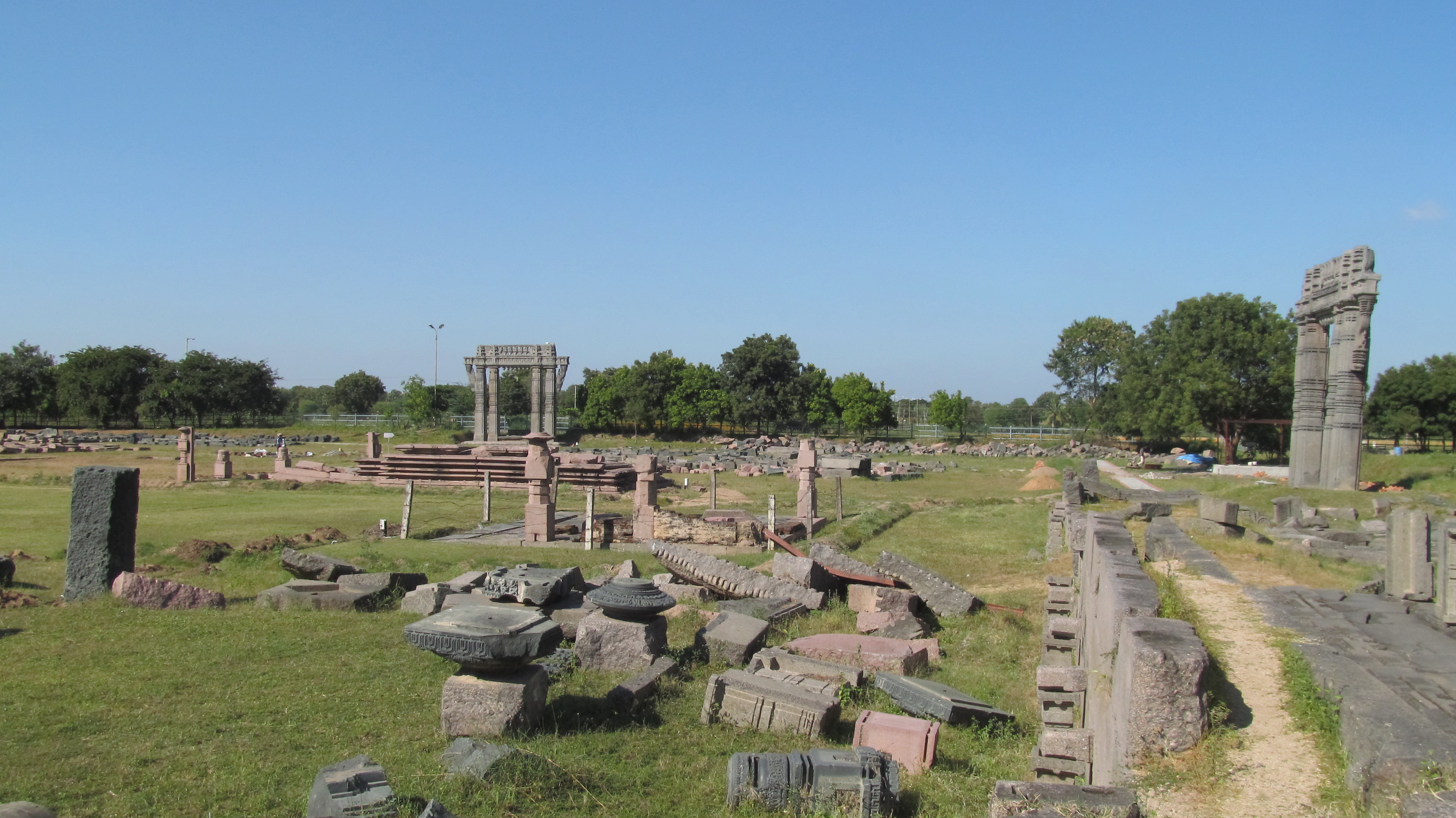
Ruins of the Warangal fort

The Delhi army left Sabar on 14 January 1310, and on 18 January, it reached a place which Amir Khusrau calls "Kunarbal". While the invaders pitched their camp, Kafur dispatched a 1000-strong cavalry unit for reconnaissance. This unit captured Hanamkonda ("Anam Konda" in Khusrau's writings), where Warangal town was clearly visible from. The unit encountered three Hindu horsemen, killed one of them, and sent his body to Malik Kafur.

Malik Kafur examined the Warangal fort twice, before besieging it. The fortification at Warangal comprised an inner stone fort surrounded by a ditch, and an outer mud fort surrounded by a moat. The Kakatiya king Prataparudra lived in the inner stone fort.

On 19 January 1310, Malik Kafur pitched his tent on the Hanamkonda hill. The Delhi commander Nasir-ul-mulk Siraj-ud-daula Khwaja Haji assigned his soldiers in such a way that the Warangal fort was completely surrounded. Every tuman (unit of 10,000 soldiers) was assigned a piece of land around the fort, and a strong wooden wall was constructed around the tents to secure them against attacks from the countryside.

The Kakatiyas also assigned commanders to guard each tower (kangura) of the fort. According to the 16th century Telugu chronicle Pratapa-Charita, the outer fort had 70 bastions, each of which was defended by a nayaka (commander). The defenders threw stones and bricks at the attackers. One night, the Kakatiya governor Vinayaka Deva (also called Banik Deo or Manik-deva) led a sortie with a 1000-strong cavalry. Both the sides lost several soldiers in this conflict, but ultimately, the Kakatiyas were forced to abort their attack.

During Vinayaka Deva's sortie, the invaders captured some of the defenders, who revealed that three elephants had been stationed at Dhamdum, a town near Warangal. The Delhi commander Malik Qara Beg Maisara was dispatched to seize these elephants. Although they were moved to another place, Qara Beg succeeded in capturing them.

Malik Kafur ordered that stone balls be gathered for the stone-throwing machines (manjaniq maghribi) that were positioned all around the encircled fort, so presumably the defenders also had stone catapults and threw stone balls at Kafur's army. The invaders filled the outer moat at one place with mud, stones and other objects. They then advanced to the outer mud wall: on one side of the fort, the invaders broke the wall with blows of hard stones; on the other side, they breached several doors with the help of munjaniq siege engines. During the night of 13 February, Malik Kafur had his soldiers build tall ladders to scale the ramparts for a decisive assault. The next morning, the invaders launched a determined assault on the outer fort, and captured it by 16 February.

The invaders now needed to cross the inner ditch, and breach the inner stone fort. However, this was a very challenging task: According to Khusrau, the walls of the inner fort were "so smooth that an ant could not climb them". The fort was so well-constructed that it was impossible to breach it using munjaniq siege engines or pick-axes.

== Prataparudra's surrender ==
By this time, the people inside the Warangal fort were facing a dire situation because of the prolonged siege. As the invaders were thinking how to breach the inner fort, the Kakatiya ruler Prataparudra decided to surrender. According to Barani's account, once Alauddin did not receive any updates on the siege for over a month (presumably because the communication arrangements made by him had been disrupted by the enemy activities). He sent his emissary Qazi Mughisuddin of Bayana to the reputed Muslim saint Shaikh Nizamuddin Aulia, requesting the saint to prophesize the outcome of the siege. The saint prophesied Alauddin's victory in Warangal and in other future campaigns. On the same day, Alauddin received news about his army's victory in Warangal.

The Muslim chroniclers state that Prataparudra sent Malik Kafur a golden statue of himself with a chain round its neck to symbolize his unconditional surrender. He offered the invaders a substantial amount of wealth including precious stones, elephants and horses. Malik Kafur, following Alauddin's instructions, asked him to surrender all his wealth, and threatened to massacre the city's population if he was found withholding any wealth. Prataparudra agreed to these terms. According to Barani, the wealth surrendered by him to Malik Kafur included 100 elephants, 7000 horses, and many precious articles. Amir Khan states that the total wealth surrendered by Prataparudra was "more than the minds of the wise could apprehend". He also jokingly prayed to God to keep Prataparudra alive till the day of the Last Judgment, because the Kakatiya ruler promised to pay a huge annual tribute to the Delhi Sultanate. Khusrau quotes a messenger of Prataparudra as saying that one of the surrendered precious stones was "unrivaled in the world": the wise philosophers refused to believe that such a substance could even exist. The 18th century chronicler Khafi Khan identified this precious stone as the famous Koh-i-Noor diamond.

The invading army was not able to breach the inner fort of Warangal, and Prataparudra did not personally submit to Malik Kafur: only his envoys met the invaders to negotiate the truce. The 14th century chronicler Isami states that Malik Kafur also gifted Prataparudra a "robe of honour embroidered with jewels" after the peace treaty.

== Aftermath ==
Malik Kafur started his return journey to Delhi on 20 March 1310, after conducting a review of his army. He reached Delhi on 9 June, via Devagiri, Dhar and Jhain.

On 23 June 1310, Malik Kafur formally presented the loot from Warangal to Sultan Alauddin in a darbar organized at Chabutra-i Nasiri near the Badaun Gate. The loot was carried on a thousand camels, and arrangements were made for the public to see the treasure. Alauddin was very pleased with Kafur, and rewarded him generously.

In 1310, Prataparudra contributed the majority of the troops for Alauddin's campaigns against the Pandyas, his southern neighbours. Subsequently, he appears to have stopped paying tribute to the Delhi Sultanate. This resulted in another Delhi Sultanate expedition against him after Alauddin's death. In this 1318 expedition, Khusrau Khan extracted tribute from him. After the fall of the Khalji dynasty, Prataparudra was decisively defeated by an expedition sent in 1323 by the Delhi Sultanate's new ruler Ghiyath al-Din Tughluq. He was captured, and according to most accounts, died while being taken to Delhi.
