= 1311 massacre of Mongols in the Delhi Sultanate =

- Location: Delhi Sultanate
- Date: 1311
- Target: Mongol men
- Attack type: Genocidal massacre
- Deaths: 20,000-30,000
- Perpetrator: Alauddin Khalji
- Motive: Anti-Mongolianism

In 1311, the Delhi Sultanate ruler Alauddin Khalji ordered a mass massacre of the "New Muslims" (Mongols who had recently converted to Islam), after some Mongol amirs of Delhi conspired to kill him. According to chronicler Ziauddin Barani, 20,000 or 30,000 Mongols were killed as a result of this order.

== Background ==
The Khalji dynasty of the Delhi Sultanate was of Turco-Afghan ethnicity and had fought several wars against the Mongol invaders from Central Asia. In 1292, the Delhi Sultan Jalaluddin Khalji had permitted several thousand Mongols to settle in his empire after they converted to Islam. These Mongol converts were called New Muslims (or Neo-Muslims), and by 1311, more than 10,000 of them lived in the capital Delhi alone. Several of them served in the Delhi army, and during the 1299 Gujarat campaign of Jalaluddin's successor Alauddin, some of them had staged an unsuccessful mutiny. After facing three other rebellions (not by Mongols), Alauddin had taken several measures to prevent further rebellions, including prohibition and confiscation of wealth from his subjects. His administration had greatly reduced salaries and inams (feudal land grants) of the Mongol amirs, and some of them had lost their employment. All these factors caused discontent among the leading Mongols of Delhi.

== Conspiracy against Alauddin ==
In 1310-1311, Alauddin had sent his general Malik Kafur on a campaign to the southern Hoysala and Pandya kingdoms. During Kafur's invasion of the Pandya kingdom, his Mongol commander Abachi (or Abaji Mughal) conspired to betray the imperial forces and to kill Kafur. The plot failed, and Abachi was brought as a prisoner to Delhi, where Alauddin ordered him to be executed.

Abachi's execution prompted the already resentful Mongols to conspire against Alauddin. The conspirators made a plan to kill Alauddin when he would come out to fly his hawks, wearing a cloak without any armour. Alauddin's attendants at this time would be unarmed, so the Mongols thought that a contingent of 200-300 Mongol horsemen could easily overpower them. The conspirators planned to set up a government after killing Alauddin. They believed that the general public would support them for liberating the people from Alauddin's tyranny.

== Alauddin's order ==
Before the Mongol amirs could put their plan into action, Alauddin's agents discovered the conspiracy. Alauddin then issued a confidential order, instructing his royal officers to kill all the Mongol men in his empire on a specified day. The wives and children of the victims were to be handed over to the assassins. This event has been mentioned by the 14th century chroniclers Ziauddin Barani and Isami. The later chronicler Yahya also mentions the event in Tarikh-i-Mubarakshahi, but he confuses it with the Mongol mutiny during Alauddin's Gujarat campaign.

A manuscript of Barani's Tarikh-i-Firuz Shahi states that Alauddin's order was to kill the New Muslims who held jagirs (feudal land grants). However, the term jagir was not used in Barani's days, and seems to be a copyist's addition. Alauddin ordered all New Muslim men of Delhi Sultanate to be killed. According to Barani, 20,000 or 30,000 Mongol men were massacred as a result of Alauddin's orders. Their women and children became destitute. Most of the victims were unaware of the conspiracy against Alauddin.

According to historian Peter Jackson, the victims of this massacre may have included Ali Beg and Tartaq, the Mongol commanders who had led the 1305 Mongol invasion of India. Isami states that after being defeated and imprisoned, they had been recruited into Alauddin's service (probably because of their high ranks), but they were later killed on Alauddin's orders.

== See also ==
- Dzungar genocide
- Inner Mongolia incident
