= Battle of Kannanur =

1342 battle in India

Date	March – 8 September 1342
Location	Kannanur, Tamil Nadu 10°54′47″N 78°44′29″E
Result	Madurai Sultanate victory

Belligerents
Madurai Sultanate	Hoysala Kingdom

Commanders and leaders
Ghiyas-ud-din of Madurai; Nasir-ud-Din Mahmud Damghan Shah	Veera Ballala III (executed); Virupaksha Ballala; Ballappa Dandanayaka

Strength
6,000	100,000

Casualties and losses
Unknown	Heavy
- Location of Kannanur Battle of Kannanur (India)

The Battle of Kannanur took place in 1342, in what is now Kannanur, Tamil Nadu, India. This clash involved the Hoysala dynasty and the Madurai Sultanate. King Ballala III of the Hoysalas led an expedition to conquer the Coromandal coast but faced opposition from the Madurai Sultan, Ghiyas-ud-din Muhammad Damghani. Initially, the Hoysala forces triumphed in the first encounter. However, they were defeated by the Sultan's forces during the subsequent siege of the Kannanur fort, where they were defeated by the determined Madurai forces. The retreat of the Hoysalas led to the capture and execution of Ballala III and the seizure of the Hoysala treasury by the Madurai Sultan. This significant event marked a turning point, resulting in the decline of Hoysala power in the region, leaving a lasting impact on the area's history.

== Background ==
Veera Ballala III, the King of the Hoysala dynasty, found himself embroiled in conflicts with the Delhi Sultanate, resulting in the loss of his territories. In 1340, Ghiyasuddin Damghani assumed the throne of the Madurai Sultanate. The Madurai Sultanate had initially been a part of the Delhi Sultanate but gained independence during the rule of Jalaluddin Ahsan Khan in 1335.

Kannanur held significant historical importance as a city within the Hoysala dynasty, having even served as its capital at certain times. However, the Hoysalas eventually lost control of Kannanur to the Delhi Sultanate, and subsequently, it became a part of the Madurai Sultanate's territory.

== The Battle ==
In 1342, Ballala III embarked on a campaign to capture the Coromandel coast from the Madurai Sultanate. The Hoysala forces, comprising with an army of 100,000 men, including 20,000 Muslims, encountered opposition from Ghiyasuddin's Madurai forces near Kannanur with the army of the only 6,000. The battle ended in a victory for Ballala, and the Sultans retired to Madura. Ballala then besieged the fort of Kannanur for ten months..

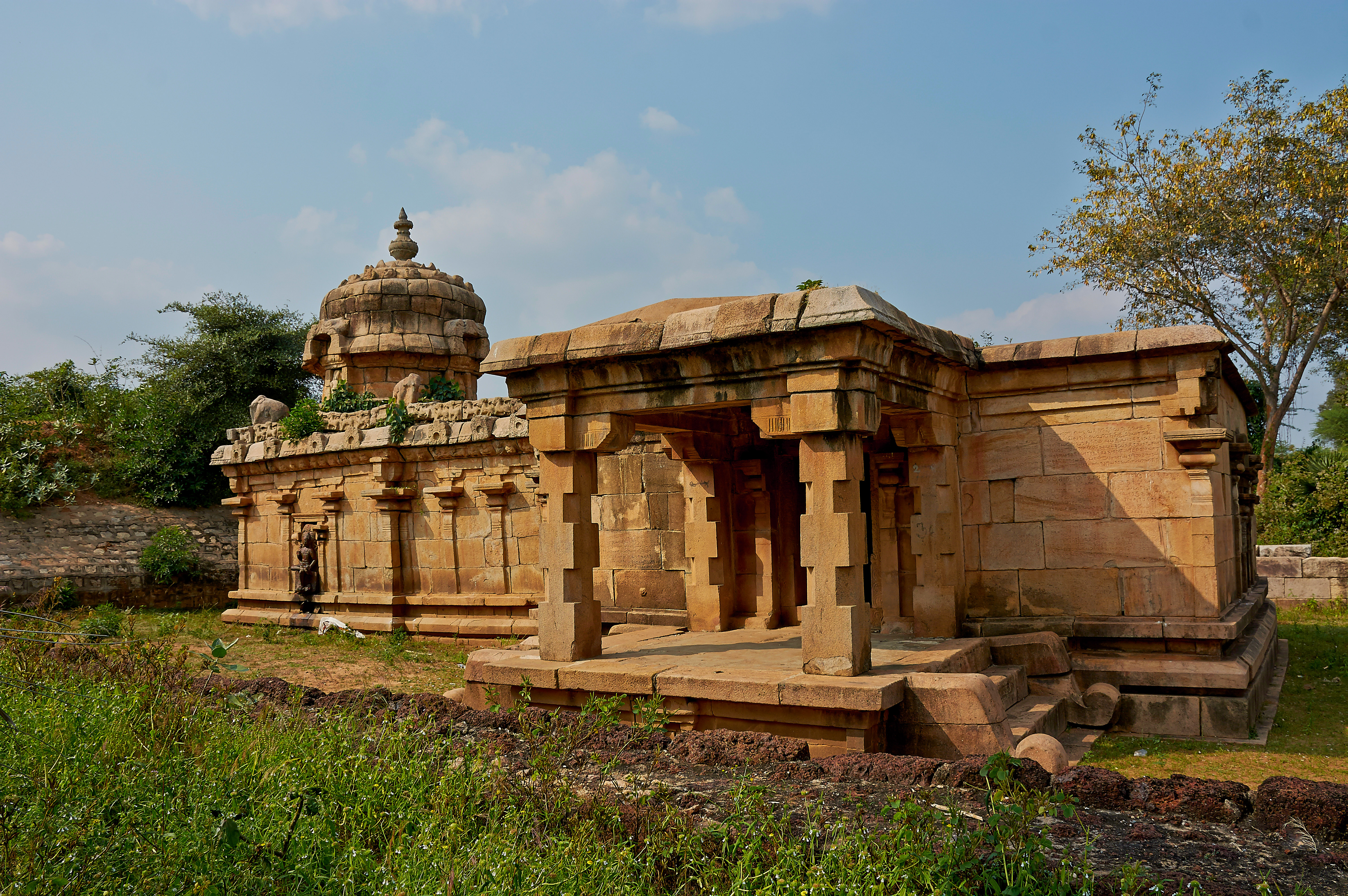
An image from Kannanur

== Final conflict ==
The Hoysala forces initiated a march towards the Kannanur fort with the intent to besiege and capture it. Ballala led a ten-month-long siege and extended an offer to the Sultan to surrender. However, Ghiyasuddin, with a cavalry of 6,000 strong, personally advanced toward the Hoysala frontier to capture Ballala. Ballala's soldiers who were not prepared for the attack, had sent their horses to graze. When they saw that the advancing army was not a band of decoits, as they had originally surmised, but the forces of Ghias-ud-din, they fled in confusion. Ballala tried to jump on his horse though he was eighty years old and was captured; Following the loss of their king, the Hoysala forces were compelled to retreat. Later Ballala was executed after his treasury was captured.
