= Veera Ballala III =

Hoysala King from 1292 to 1342

Hoysala King
- Reign: 31 January 1292 – 8 September 1342
- Predecessor: Narasimha III
- Successor: Veera Ballala IV
- Born: c. 1262
- Died: 8 September 1342 (aged 79–80); Kannanur
- Spouse: Chikkayi-Tayi of Alupa
- Dynasty: Hoysala

Veera Ballala III (c. 1262 – 8 September 1342) was the last great king of the Hoysala Empire. During his rule, the northern and southern branches of the Hoysala empire (which included much of modern Karnataka and northern Tamil Nadu in India) were consolidated and administered from Halebidu (also known as Dwarasamudra). During his rule, he fought numerous wars with the Yadavas of Devagiri, the Pandyan Dynasty of Madurai and other minor dynasties of South India. But it was his conflict with the invading forces of Alauddin Khalji, and later those of Muhammad bin Tughluq, the Sultan of Delhi, that would alter the course of history of South India. For his courage and fortitude, the historians Suryanath Kamath, Chopra, Ravindran and Subrahmanian have called him a "great ruler". With his death in c. 1343, South India saw the rise of a new Hindu empire, the Vijayanagara Empire. In the words of the historian Sen "the Hoysalas were the greatest among those who claim to be the makers of modern Mysore". Harihara I and Bukka Raya I, the brothers who founded the Vijayanagara Empire had served the king in a military capacity.

== Pandya and Yadava affairs ==
In c. 1303, Veera Ballala III subdued the recalcitrant Alupas of Dakshina Kannada. His attempts to reduce the Yadava power did not diminish either. In c. 1305, Veera Ballala III successfully fought the invading Yadavas at Holalkere and pushed them back to Lakkundi. He dealt swiftly with the rebellious Kadambas of Hangal and the Santaras of Shimoga (Hosagunda). Around 1310, Ballala III successfully played 'king maker' in the affairs of Tamil country by appointing Sundara Pandya as the Pandya king as opposed to his competitor, Vira Pandya. However his focus the rebellious ruler Kampilideva of the Kampili Chiefdom on the banks of the Tungabhadra River and on the affairs in the Tamil country to the south laid open the northern boundaries of his territories to the invasion of Malik Kafur, the commander of the armies of All-ud-din-Khalji. The Yadavas themselves, according to historian John Keay, provided the necessary help to Mallik Kafur's armies to march south. Halebidu was attacked and plundered on 26 February 1311, only to be rebuilt in 1316. Veera Ballala III had to accept defeat to the Delhi Sultan, pay a handsome tribute, and send his son Veera Virupaksha to Delhi as an act of submission. His son returned in 1313. According to historian John Keay, claims by later writers such as Ferishta that Mallik Kafur even built a mosque in Halebidu to establish his supremacy are legends without historical evidence.

== Invasion from Delhi ==
By 1318, the Yadava kingdom had been completely destroyed and Devagiri occupied by the Delhi Sultan. The Delhi Sultanate was now being ruled by Qutbuddin Mubarak Shah. Veera Ballala III refused to pay tribute and withdrew from his earlier pact to support the Delhi Sultanate as a vassal. Tughluq sent an army to the south in c. 1327 and Halebidu was plundered for a second time. Veera Ballala III had to find refuge in Tiruvannamalai from where he continued his resistance. By c. 1336 all Hindu kingdoms of south India with the exception of the Hoysala Empire had been defeated and large areas annexed by the Sultanate of Delhi. The Madurai Sultanate was also established around c. 1335–6. With an intention of confronting the Muslim invasion, Veera Ballala III founded a second capital called Hosapattna on the banks of Tungabhadra river, which according to historians Henry Heras and William Coelho, later came to be called Vijayanagara, the capital of the Vijayanagara Empire. In c. 1342–3, a decisive war that would end the Hoysala fortunes was fought at Kannanur. Veera Ballala III fought a pitched battle against Ghiyas-ud-din, the Sultan of Madurai. Just when a Hoysala victory seemed imminent, the Hoysala monarch was captured and, according to historians Chopra et al., was "strangled and flayed". His son, Veera Ballala IV met the same fate in c. 1346, bringing to an end the rule of the Hoysalas.

== Notes ==
Preceded by Narasimha III	Hoysala ?	Succeeded by Veera Ballala IV
