= South Kannanur =

- Neighborhood in Tiruchirapalli
- Location in Tamil Nadu, India
- Coordinates: 10°54′47″N 78°44′29″E
- Country: India
- State: Tamil Nadu
- District: Tiruchirappalli

Population (2001)
  - Total: 11,045

Languages
  - Official: Tamil
- Time zone: UTC+5:30 (IST)

South Kannanur is a Neighborhood of Tiruchirapalli in Tiruchirappalli district in the Indian state of Tamil Nadu.

== Demographics ==
As of 2001 India census, South Kannanur had a population of 11,045. Males constitute 49% of the population and females 51%. South Kannanur has an average literacy rate of 71%, higher than the national average of 59.5%: male literacy is 78%, and female literacy is 64%. In South Kannanur, 11% of the population is under 6 years of age.

== History ==
Kannanur was an important city of the Hoysala Empire. In 1342 or 1343, the Battle of Kannanur was fought between the forces of the great Hoysala emperor Veera Ballala III and Ghiyas-ud-din, the Sultan of Madurai. The victory was clear for the Hoysalas, but Veera Ballala III was captured and slain. This was the end of the rule of the great Hoysalas.
