= Halebidu =

Halebidu Dvārasamudra, Dōrasamudra, Haḷēbīḍu
- Hobli
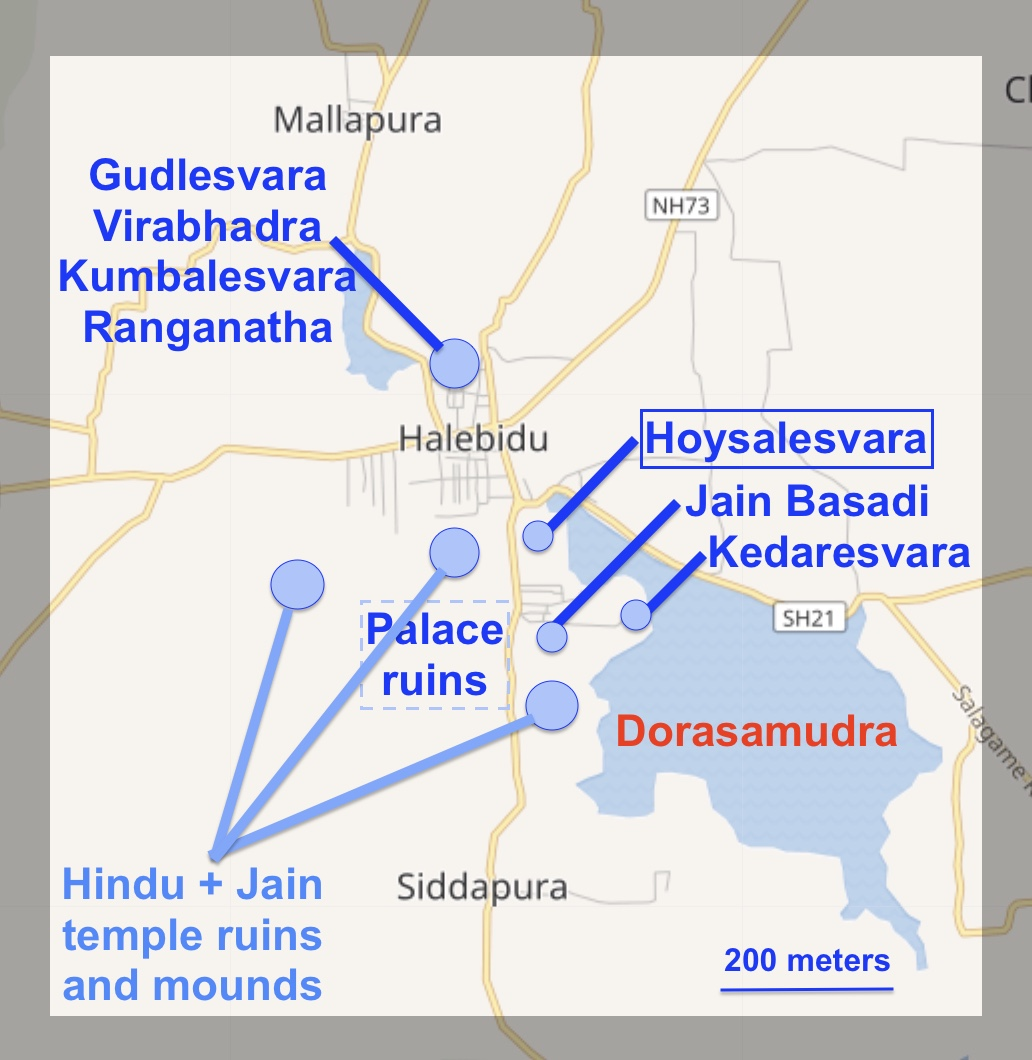

- Karnataka, India Halebidu (India)
- Coordinates: 13.2157°N 75.9914°E
- Country: India
- State: Karnataka
- District: Hassan district
- Region: Malenadu
- Elevation: 880 m (2,890 ft)

Population (2011)
  - Total: 6,458
- Time zone: UTC+5:30 (IST)
- PIN: 573121
- Telephone code: 08172
- Website: karnataka.gov.in

Halebidu (IAST: Haḷēbīḍu, literally "old capital, city, encampment" or "ruined city") is a Hobli located in Hassan District, Karnataka, India. Historically known as Dvārasamudra (also Dorasamudra), Halebidu became the regal capital of the Hoysala Empire in the 11th century CE. (Note: Dorasamudra was one of the capitals of the Hoysalas. Governors had their own capital, with temples and infrastructure. Sosavur (Sasapura, Sasakapura) was their first capital. Belur served as another capital for a part of the 12th-century. The king used to relocate and stay for extended periods in other capitals. However, Dorasamudra is repeatedly called as the srimad rajdhani ("most illustrious capital") in inscriptions found in distant parts of the Hoysala kingdom.) In the modern era literature it is sometimes referred to as Halebeedu or Halebid as the phonetic equivalent, a local name after it was damaged and deserted after being ransacked and looted twice by the forces of the Turko-Persian Delhi Sultanate in the 14th century.

Halebidu is home to some of the best examples of Hindu and Jain temples with Hoysala architecture. These show the breadth of Hindu artwork traditions - Shiva, Vishnu, Devi and Vedic deities - fused into the same temple complex, depicted with a diversity of regional heritages, along with inscriptions in scripts from across India. The Hindu temples include Jaina reliefs in its panel. Similarly, the Jaina artwork includes the different Tirthankara as well as a Saraswati within its mantapa. Most notable among the Halebidu monuments are the ornate Hoysalesvara temple, Kedareshwara temple, Jaina Basadi temples, as well as the Hulikere step well (kalyani). These sites are within a kilometer of each other. The Hoysaleshwara Temple remains the only surviving monument in Halebidu.

== Location ==
Halebidu is connected by road to Hassan on SH-21 (30 km), Mysore (150 km) and Mangalore on NH-73 (184 km). It is about 15 kilometers from Belur, another site known for its intricately carved Hoysala era temples.

== History ==
Halebidu is in the midst of a valley east of the Western Ghats (Sahyadri Mountains in Karnataka). It is surrounded by low-lying mountains, boulders and seasonal rivers. This valley is well connected to northern Karnataka, western Andhra Pradesh and northern Tamil Nadu. Around this region, between the 10th and 14th-century, the Hoysaḷa dynasty came to power, whose history is unclear. By their own 11th and 12th-century inscriptions, they were descendants of the Krishna-Baladeva-roots and the Yadavas of Devagiri. They married into the Kalyani Chalukya dynasty, known for its temple and art tradition. Modern historians widely identify the Hoysalas as originally a Jain family. The earliest references to the dynasty, including inscriptions and local traditions, depict their rulers as followers and patrons of Jainism. A hill chief called Sala from the Sahyadri range of Karnataka, remembered for the legend of killing a tiger or lion to save his Jain guru, the monk Sudattamuni. From this early beginning, the family consolidated and gradually expanded its power from the 10th century onward.

Halebidu was built anew near a large reservoir by the early Hoysala kings, with support from their governors, merchants, and artisans. (Note: The Hoysalas built many water reservoirs throughout their realm, a source of their political stability, public support and economic prosperity. Such public infrastructure projects began at least in the 11th-century and continued through the early 13th-century. This is evidenced by the texts of their era and inscriptions found near these reservoirs, water tanks and temples. They also built canals and completed irrigation projects.) They greatly excavated and expanded the Dorasamudra reservoir. Major and spectacularly carved Hindu and Jain temples were already complete by the 12th century. Around the city were fort walls, generally tracing a rounded square-like area with an average span of 2.25 kilometers. Inside were four major water reservoirs and many smaller public water tanks. The city life, it major temples and the roads were centered near the Dorasamudra water reservoir. The city several dozen temples, of which only a small set has survived. Three set of temples – Hoysaleswara (twin temple), Jain Basadi (three temples) and Kedareshvara (one temple) – were the largest, more sophisticated in their architecture and artwork, while the rest were simpler.

To the immediate west of the major Hindu and Jain temples was the Hoysala Palace. This palace stretched south up to the Benne Gudda (lit., butter hill). The palace is completely ruined and gone, with section lost in mounds and fragments found near the Benne Gudda. To the west of the palace was another group of Hindu and Jain temples – the Nāgareshvara site, also destroyed whose ruins have been found in mounds. To the north of the original Hoysala city was a Saraswati temple and a Krishna temple, both also ruined and mostly lost. Towards the center and south of the old city were Hucesvara temple and a Rudresvara temple, evidenced by inscriptions and ruins that have been discovered. Four temples in northeastern section have survived – Gudlesvara, Virabhadra, Kumbalesvara and Ranganatha. The western part of the fortified section and beyond the fort were the historic farms that fed the population of the Dorasamudra capital. Roads connected the Hoysala capital to other major towns and pilgrimage sites such as Belur and Pushpagiri. Numerous inscriptions dating between mid 10th-century to early 13th-century attest to the importance of Dorasamudra to various Hoysala kings.

After the first invasion and destruction of Dorasamudra in the 14th century, inscriptions suggest that there were attempts to repair the temples, palace and infrastructure in Dorasamudra. As a condition to an end to the invasion, Malik Kafur of Turko-Persian Delhi Sultanate demanded the monarch Veera Ballala III to accept suzerainty of Khalji, pay tribute and provide logistical support to the Sultanate forces seeking to raid and loot the fabled wealth in the Pandya capital of Madurai in Tamil Nadu. Additional waves of wars of destruction and loot from the Turko-Persian Sultanates ended the Hoysala kingdom and Dorasamudra's prosperity as a capital city. For nearly 300 years, Dorasamudra saw no new inscriptions or evidence of political or economic prosperity. A mid 17th-century Nayaka era inscription in Belur thereafter becomes the first to mention "Halebidu". Meanwhile the surviving Hindu and Jain communities continued to support and repair the temples, with evidence of living temples in what is now the northern part of Halibidu.

== Monuments ==
The major historic monuments in Halebid include:

- Hoysaleswara Temple – the largest and most elaborate, a twin temple dedicated to Shiva with a major display of reliefs of Shaivism, Vaishnavism, Shaktism and Vedic legends.
- Jain temples, Halebidu – three large temples in a row, close to Hoysaleswara, dedicated to Parshvanatha, Shantinatha and Adinatha of Jainism, major monolith Jina statues and intricately carved Saraswati
- Kedareshwara Temple, Halebidu – a three sanctum temple dedicated to Shiva, also with a galaxy of reliefs of Shaivism, Vaishnavism, Shaktism and Vedic legends.
- Northern group of historic Hindu and Jain temples – much simpler architecture and limited artwork, but living temples with ruins recovered by local community; these include the Gudlesvara, Virabhadra, Kumbaleshvara and Ranganatha temples.
- Nagaresvara and palace archaeological site – mounds and ruins; excavations of a few mounds have unearthed Hindu and Jain temple structures, idols and scattered parts
- Hulikere step well – one of the most sophisticated 12th-century step well in south Karnataka, illustrates the public water infrastructure in erstwhile Hoysala capital
- Museum – the park and near the Hoysaleswara temple

=== Nearby sites ===
- Chennakeshava Temple, Belur – 16 km from Halebidu, Belur was the first capital of the Hoysalas. The Chennakeshava temple is the largest pre-14th century Karnata tradition Hindu temples complex that has survived into the modern age.
- Bucesvara Temple, Koravangala – a twin temple near Hassan city that synthesizes the pre-Hoysala traditions of Hindu architecture, includes artwork from all three major Hindu traditions; about 35 kilometres (22 mi) southeast of Halebidu
- Nageshvara-Chennakeshava Temple complex, Mosale – another major temple complex that presents Shaivism and Vaishnavism traditions together; about 20 kilometres (12 mi) northeast of Halebidu
- Veera Narayana Temple, Belavadi – a major three sanctum temples complex, about 25 kilometers from Belur, with beautiful carvings, preserved Vesara superstructure and a galaxy of artwork from all Hindu traditions; about 12 kilometres (7.5 mi) north of Halebidu
- Lakshminarasimha Temple, Javagal – a triple sanctum shrine from the 13th century, with a galaxy of artwork from all Hindu traditions; A Vesara architecture, where the aedicule on the outer walls show many major variants of Dravida and Nagara shikhara (superstructure) styles; it is about 12 kilometres (7.5 mi) northeast from Halebidu.
- Lakshminarasimha Temple, Haranhalli and Someshvara Temple, Haranhalli – a set of Hindu temples from 1234 CE, with a complex two-storey Vesara-architecture, one dedicated to Vishnu avatars and the other to Shiva, but they include major reliefs of Vaishnavism, Shaivism and Shaktism; about 30 kilometres (19 mi) east from Halebidu.
- Ishvara Temple, Arasikere – a Vesara and Hoysala architecture Hindu temple for Shiva that illustrates the dome-style Hindu architecture for mandapa built about a hundred years before the first invasion of Delhi Sultanate and the start of Deccan version of the Indo-Islamic architecture. It is about 40 kilometers east-northeast of Halebidu.
- Lakshmi Devi Temple, Doddagaddavalli – one of the earliest Hoysala temples, four sanctums and beautifully carved; about 18 kilometres (11 mi) south of Halebidu.
- Shravanabelagola, Channarayapatna: a major group of many Jain and Hindu monuments; it is about 75 kilometres (47 mi) southeast from Belur on National Highway 75, one of the most important Digambara Jainism pilgrimage site in South India.
- Nuggehalli group of temples – about 80 kilometres (50 mi) to the east of Halebidu, with the Lakshminarasimha temple featuring an ingenious structure that makes three sanctums appear as one sanctum from outside; a Vesara architecture from the 13th century. The other major temple in the village called the Sadasiva Temple, Nuggehalli is a remarkable Hoysala synthesis of north Indian Nagara architecture with South Indian ideas on architecture.

== Gallery ==
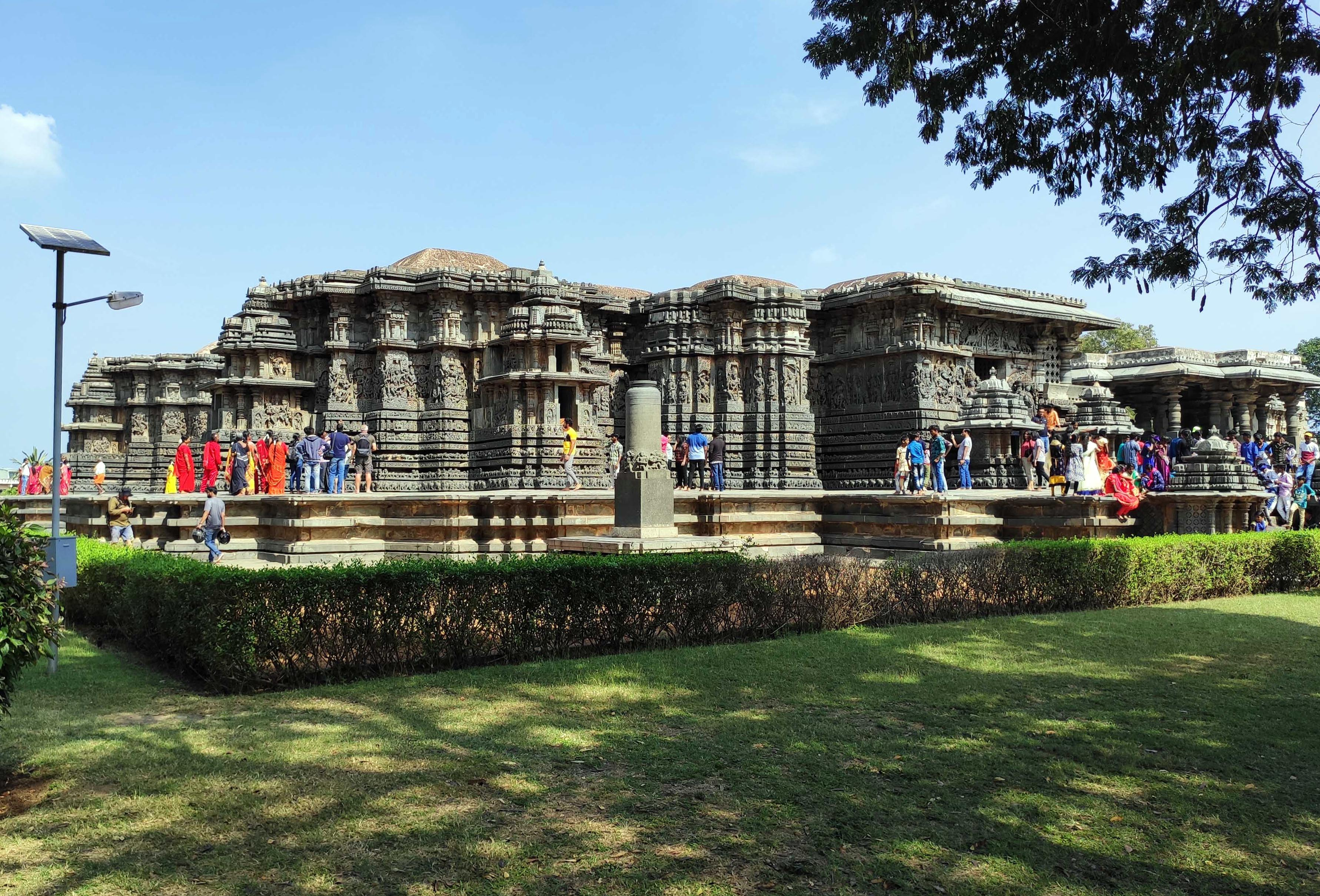
Hoysaleshwara temple, Halebid – the most studied temple in the town

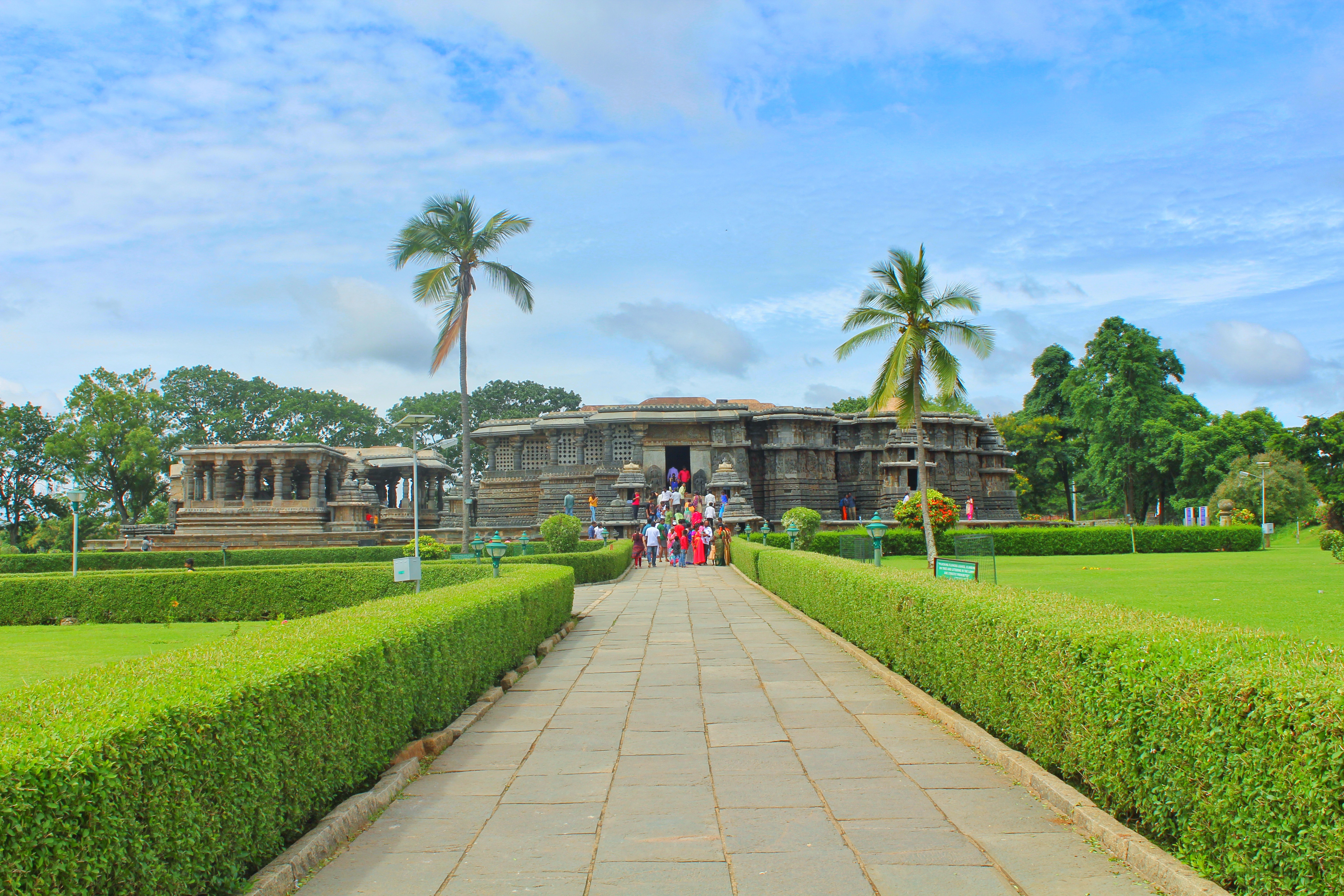
Hoysaleshwara temple

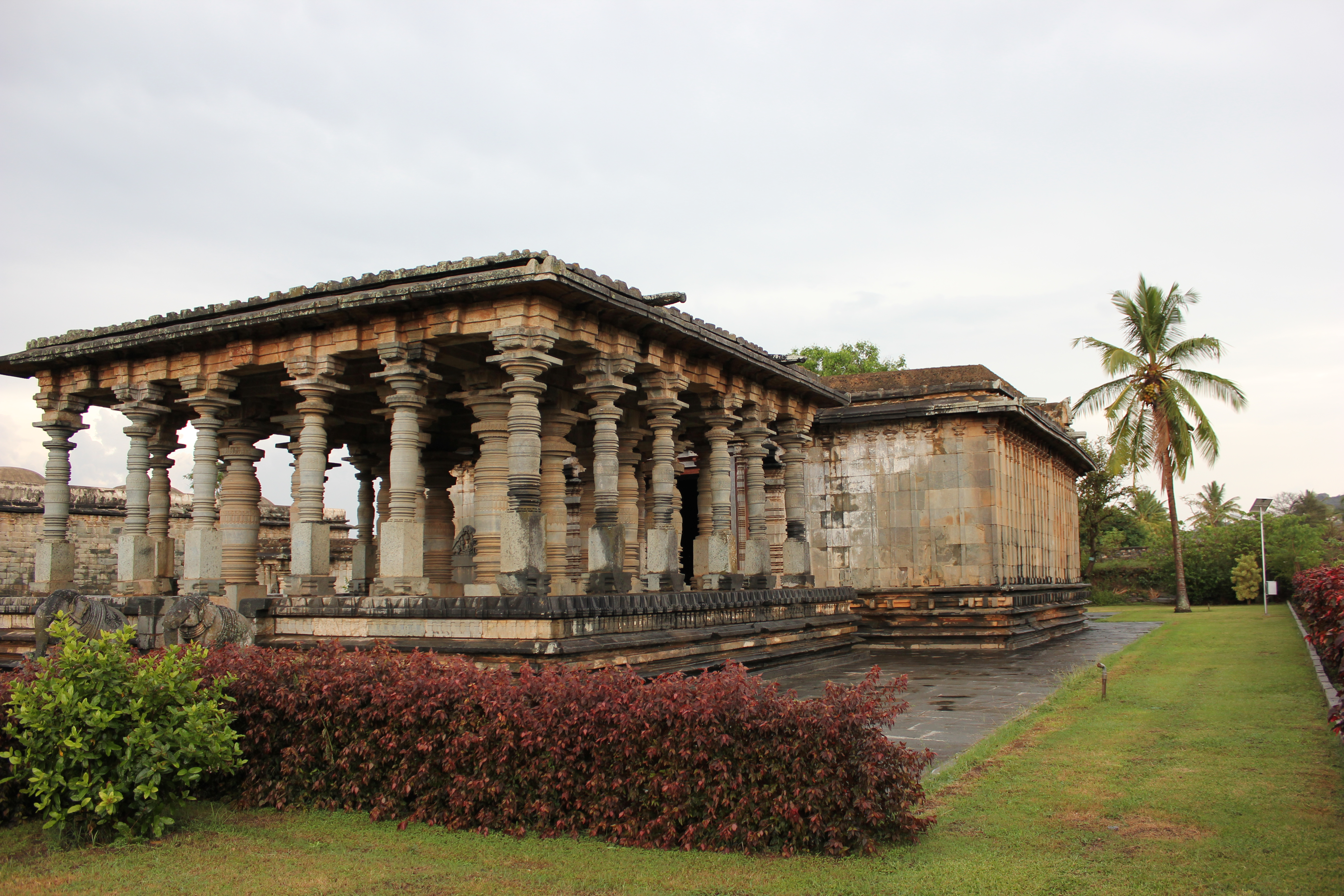
One of the three major Jain temples, Halebid

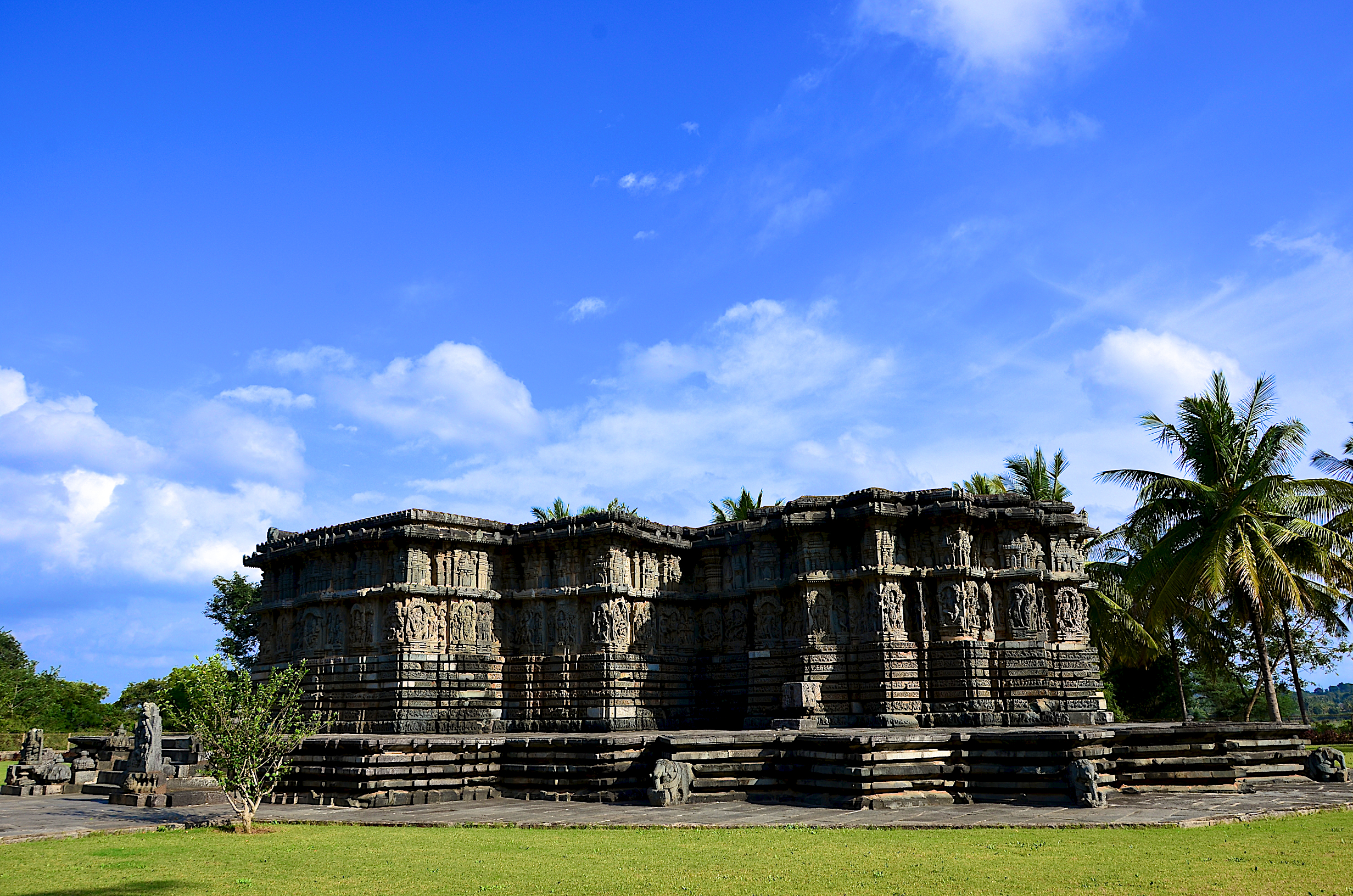
Kedareshvara temple

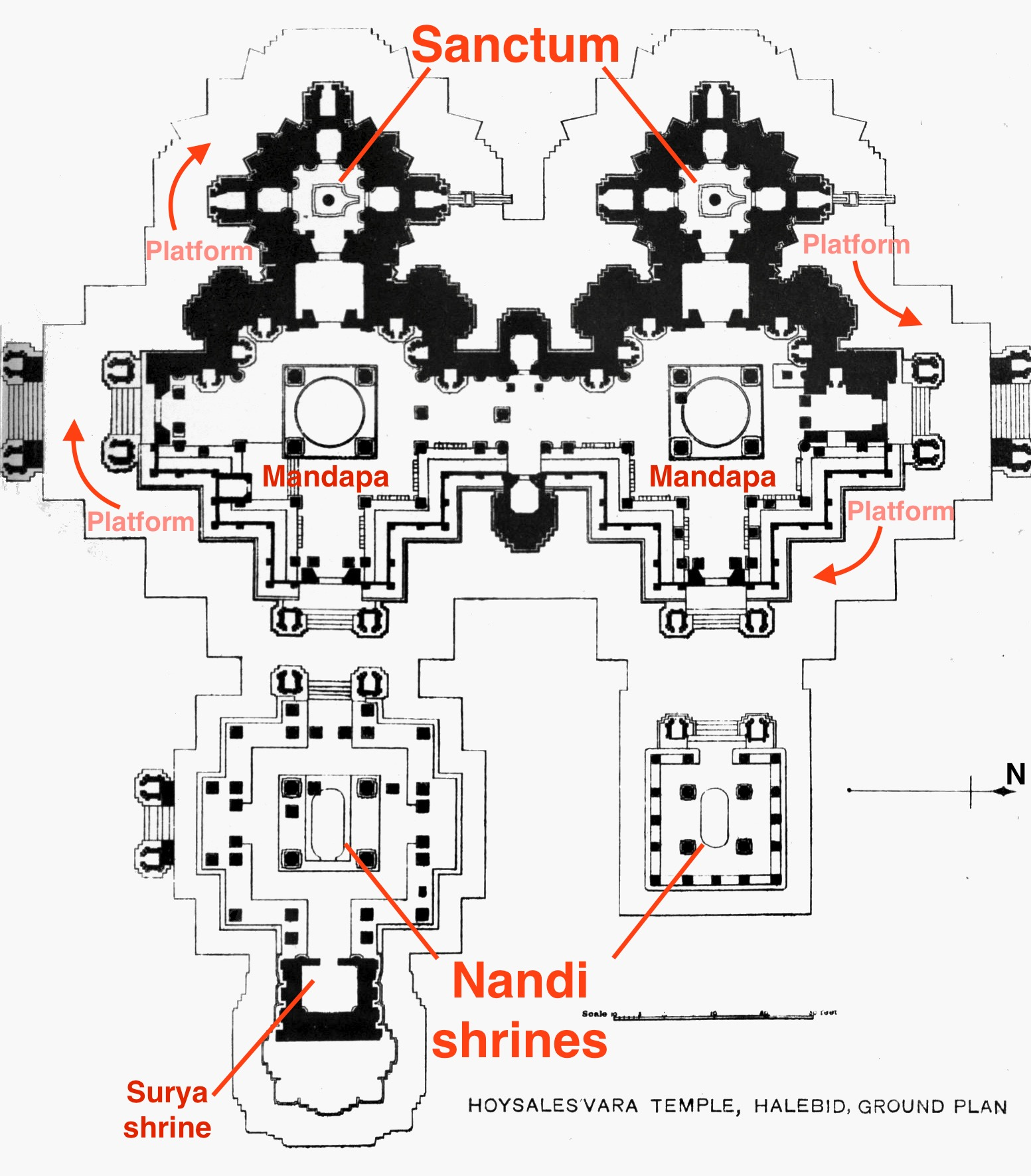
Floor plan of the Hoysaleshwar temple – a twin temple

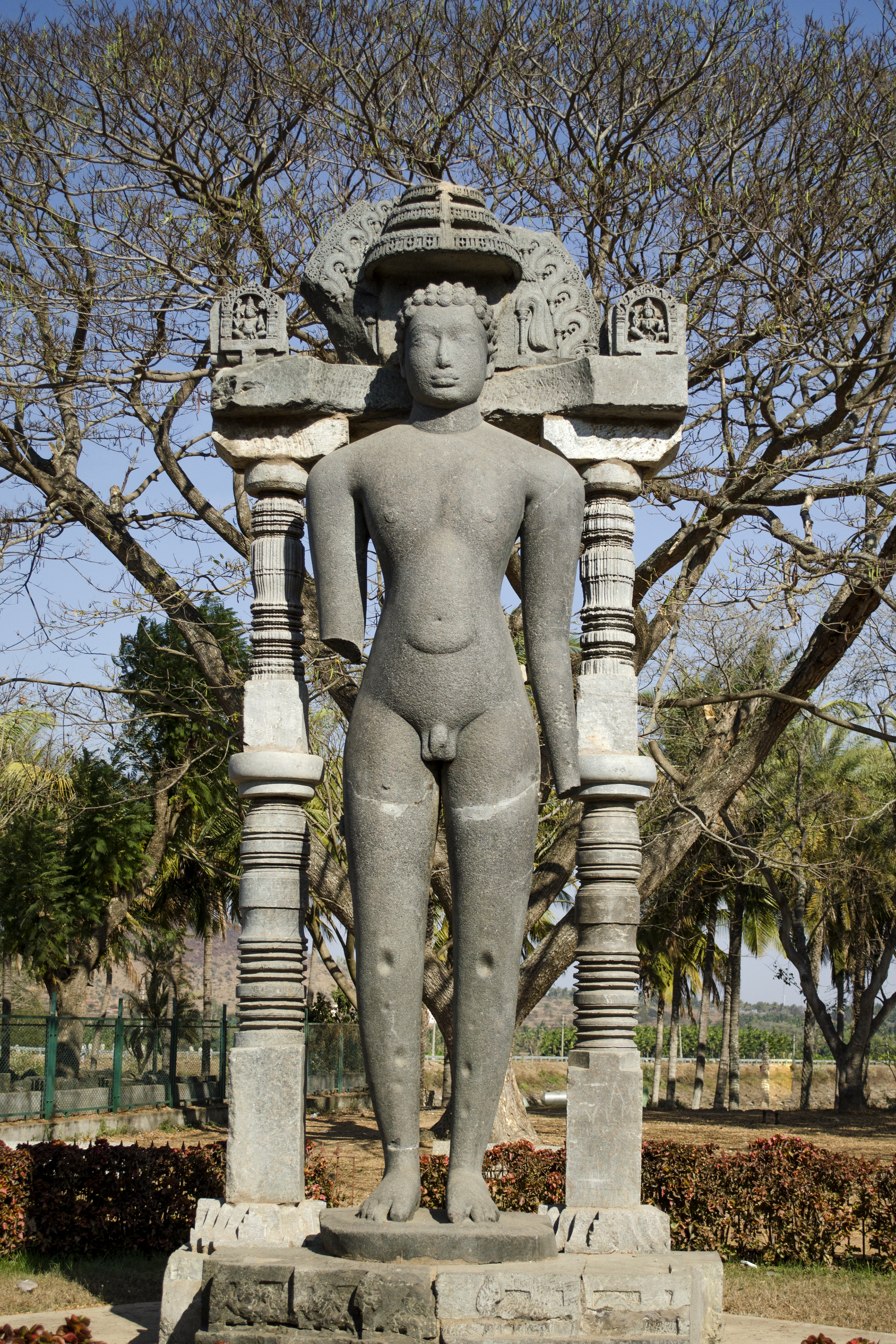
Bahubali monolith at Halebidu

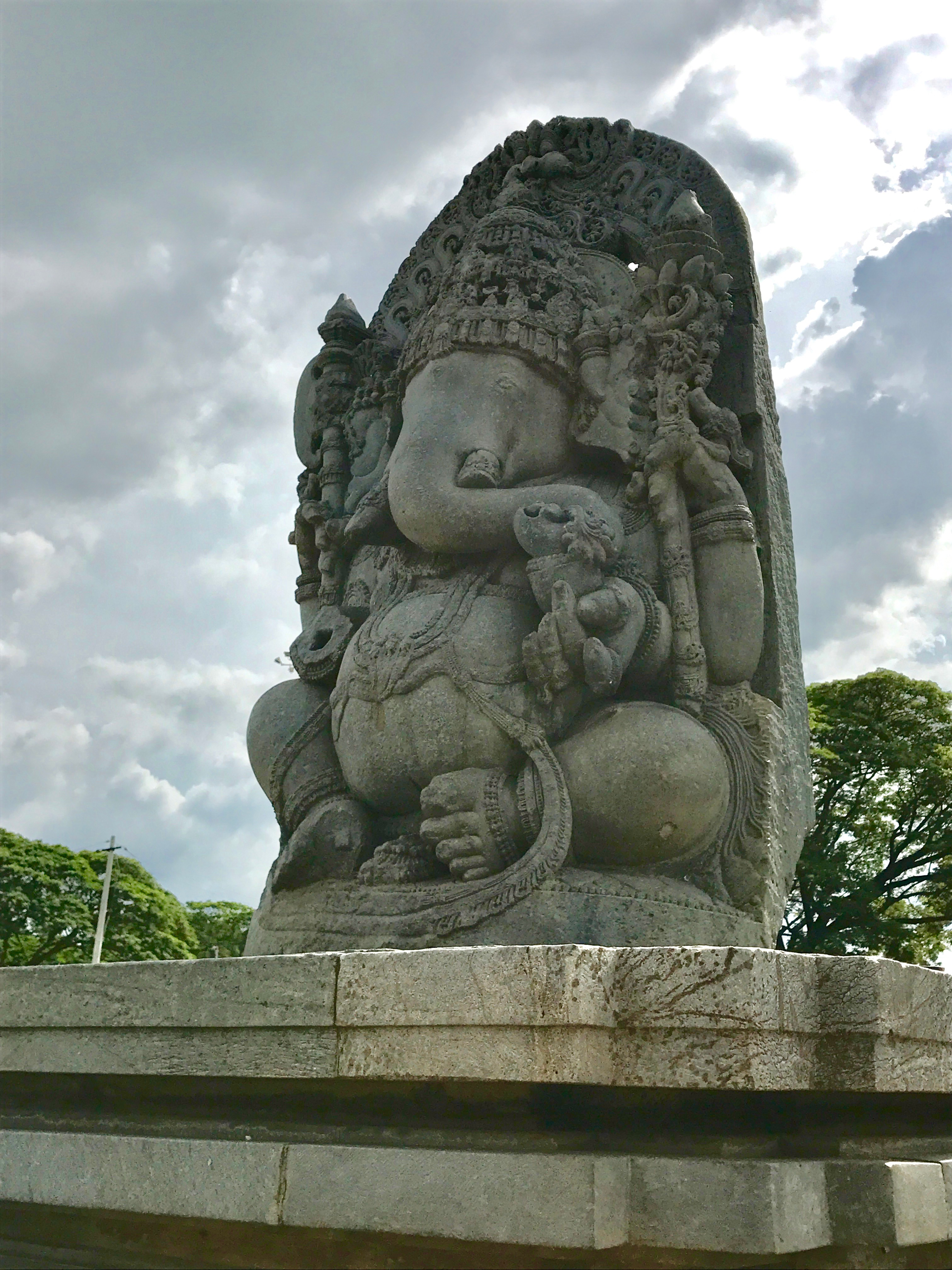
Ganesha relief in the park

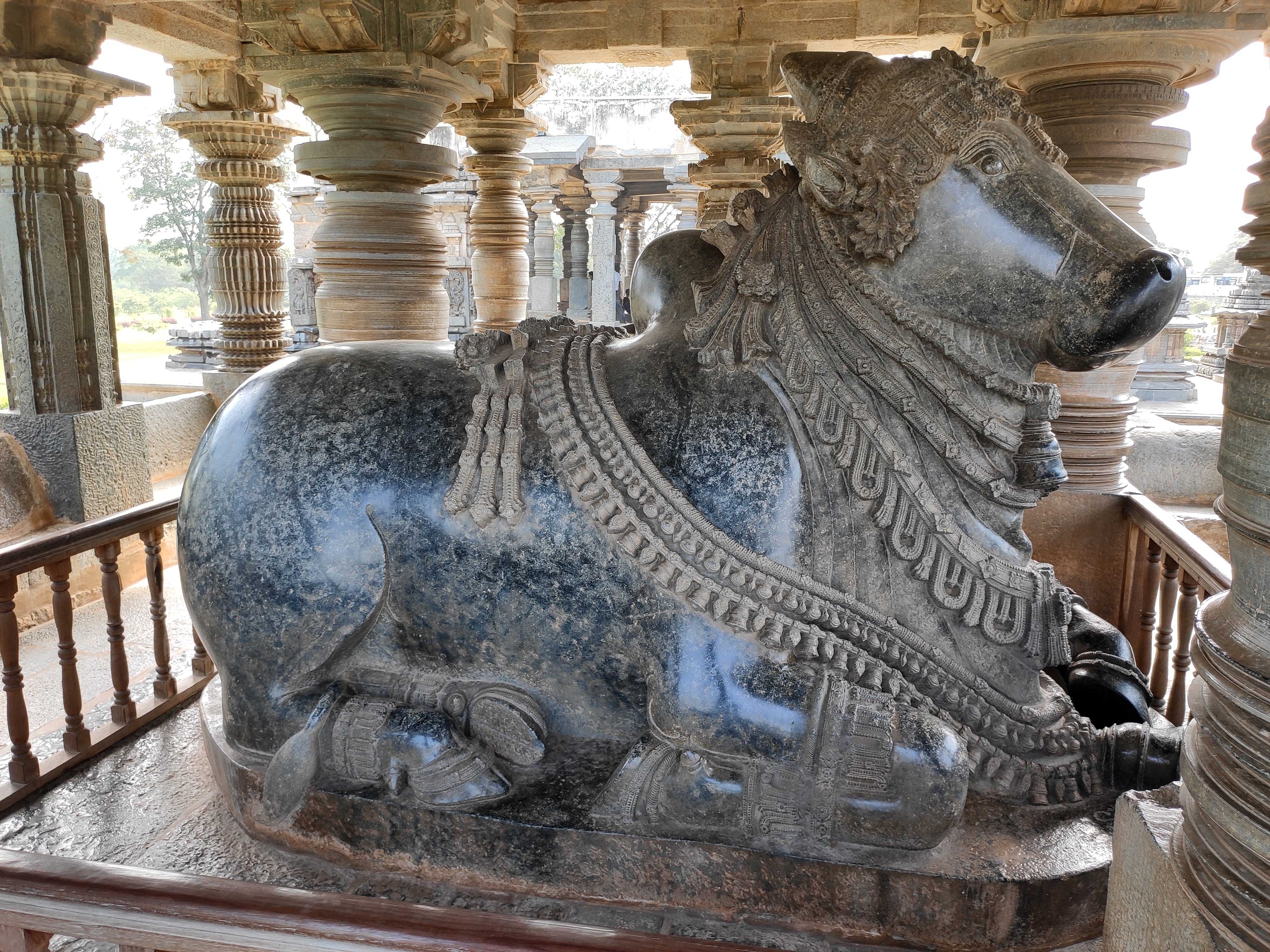
One of the two major Nandis

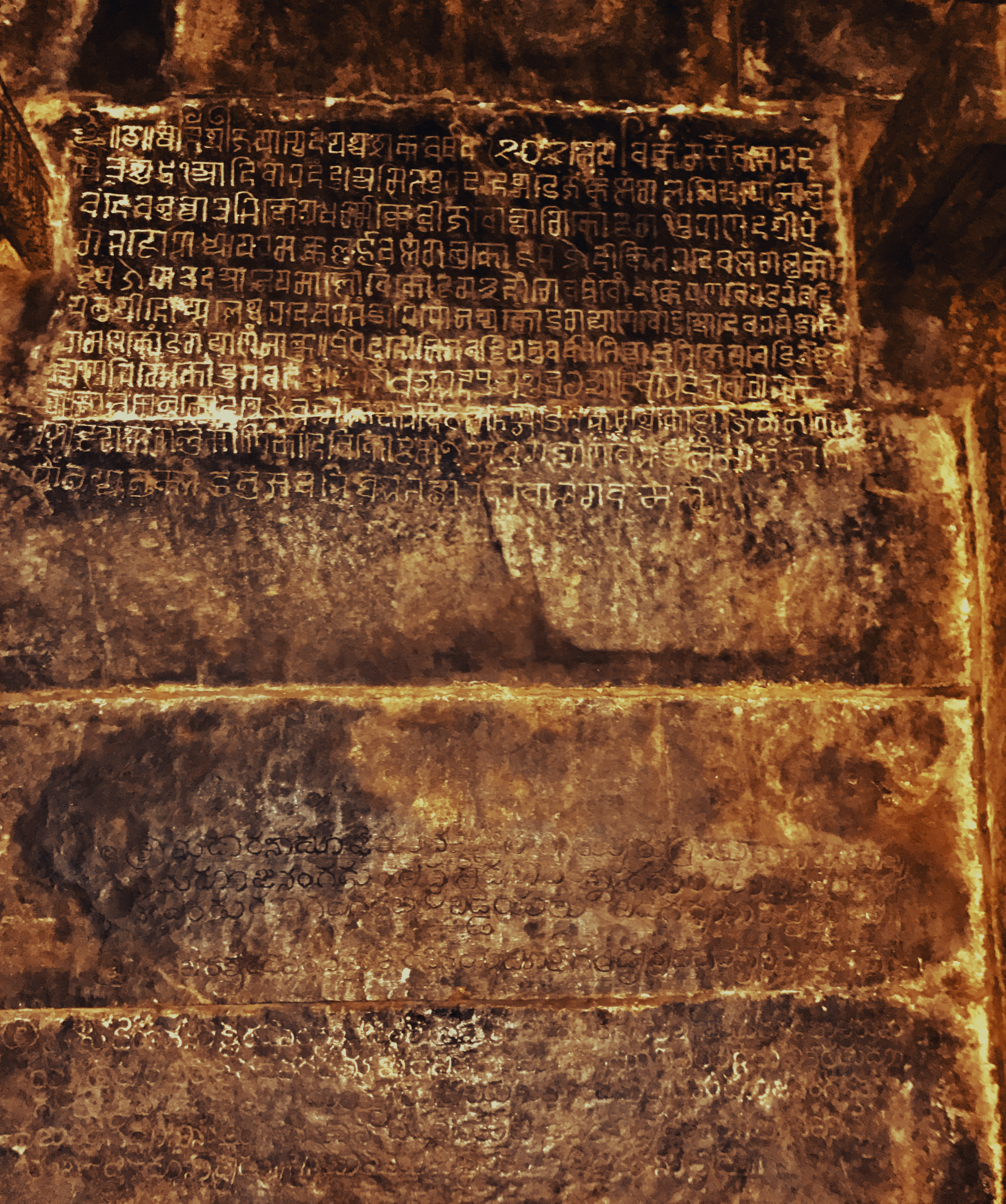
Inscriptions in diverse Indian scripts

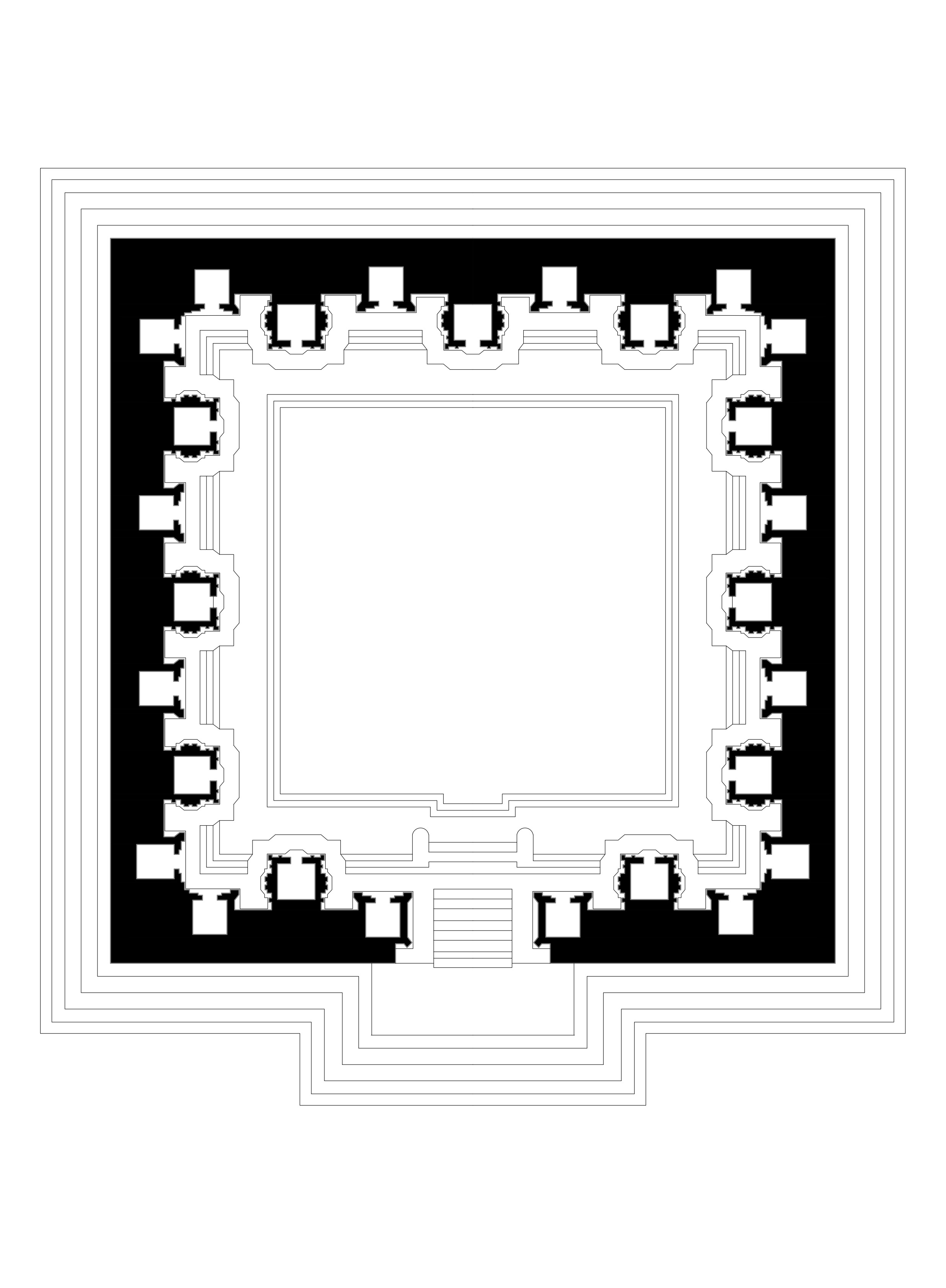
Floor plan of the Hulikere water tank built in the 12th-century

== See also ==
- Shravanabelagola
- Somanathapura
- Doddagaddavalli
- Javagal
- Banavara
