= Banarsi Prasad Saxena =

Indian historian

Banarsi Prasad Saxena (a.k.a. Banarsi Prasad Saksena) was an Indian historian associated with Allahabad University.

Saxena was awarded a PhD by University of London, School of Oriental Studies in 1931. He later became head of the departments of history in both the University of Allahabad and University of Jodhpur.

He was an expert on Emperor Shah Jahan, and his magnum opus Shah Jahan of Dilli (The subject of his PhD.) is regarded as the most authoritative text of that period and has run to several editions. Along with R.P. Tripathi he was noted as one of the major historians of the 'Allahabad School'. The idea of a "composite culture" in India, emphasizing mutual interactions between Hindu and Muslim communities in Indian history rather than treating the two communities as competitors with each other, was a particular contribution of this school.

== Selected publications ==
- Saksena, B. P. (1932), History of Shah Jahan of Dihli. (Reprinted several times including 1962, 1968, and 1975.)
- Saksena, B. P. (1941), "A Few Unnoticed Facts about the Early Life of Malik Amber", Proceedings of the Indian History Congress, 5.
- Saksena, B. P. (1956), Historical Papers Relating to Kumaon 1809–1842, Allahabad.
- Saksena, B. P. (1970), "Firuz Shah Tughluq", in Habib, Mohammad; Nizami, K. A. (eds.), Comprehensive History of India, vol. 5.
