= Abdul Malik Isami =

14th-century Indian historian

Abdul Malik Isami (1311–after 14 May 1350) was a 14th-century Indian historian and court poet. He wrote in the Persian language, under the patronage of Ala-ud-Din Bahman Shah, the founder of the Bahmani Sultanate. He is best known for Futuh-us-Salatin (c. 1350), a poetic history of the Muslim conquest of India.

== Early life ==
Isami was born in 1311, possibly in Delhi. His father's name was 'Izz ul-Din 'Isami. His ancestor Fakhr Malik Isami had migrated from Baghdad to India during the reign of Iltutmish (r. 1211–1236). In a reference to himself, he says, "(My poetic disposition) said : 'Hindustan is your place — the birth place of your grandfather and forefathers.'" He referred to the city of Delhi as the "home of Islam".

In 1327, the Delhi Sultanate ruler Muhammad bin Tughluq decided to move his capital from Delhi to Daulatabad in Deccan region. Several residents of Delhi, including Isami's family, were ordered to move to Daulatabad. His 90-year-old grandfather died during this journey.

== In Bahman Shah's service ==
At Daulatabad, Isami was appalled with what he perceived as Tughluq's misdeeds and tyranny. At one point, he decided to migrate to Mecca, but he was determined to write a history of Muslim rule in India before leaving the country. He aspired to emulate the famous Persian poet Ferdowsi, who wrote Shahnameh, an epic poem outlining the history of Persia.

Qazi Bahauddin of Daulatabad introduced him to Ala-ud-Din Bahman Shah, who had rebelled against Tughluq. Bahman Shah, who established the independent Bahmani Sultanate in the Deccan region, became Isami's patron. Isami thus became the earliest panegyrist at the Bahmani court.

Under the patronage of Bahman Shah, he started writing Futuh-us-Salatin in 1349. Isami claims to have composed its 12,000 verses in 5 months. According to him, he started writing the book on 10 December 1349, and completed it on 14 May 1350. Nothing is known about Isami's life after this point.

== Futuh-us-Salatin ==
The Futuh-us-Salatin ("Gifts of the Sultans") is a history of Muslim rule in India until 1349-50. Isami also called it Shahnama-i Hind ("the Shahnameh of India"). According to Isami, his sources included anecdotes, legends, and reports by his friends and acquaintances. Unlike several earlier chronicles, the book's language is devoid of "rhetorical artifices and unpleasant exaggeration".

The book begins with an account of the conquests of the Ghaznavid ruler Mahmud (r. 998–1002) and the Ghurid ruler Muhammad (r. 1173-1202). It then goes on to narrate the history of the Delhi Sultanate until 1349-50. The book also describes the early years of the establishment of the Bahmani Sultanate.Geography of India including the Himalayas are mentioned.Rivers include Ravi,Beas,Sarayu,Oxus and Indus.He also mentions 62 places of India.

=== Historical reliability ===
Futuh-us-Salatin is written in masnavi (rhyming poem) style, and is not fully reliable for the purposes of history. It contains factual mistakes and omits several important events. In addition, Isami implies that the various historical events were pre-determined by divine will and destiny. He believed that the presence of spiritually powerful Sufi leaders affected the fortunes of a kingdom. For example, he attributes to the decline of the Delhi Sultanate to the death of the Sufi saint Nizamuddin Auliya. Similarly, he claims that the Deccan region prospered because Burhanuddin Gharib and his successor Zainuddin Shirazi lived in Daulatabad.

Isami is highly critical of Muhammad bin Tughluq. On the other hand, he calls his patron Bahman Shah as the rightful caliph. He claims that Tughluq forced the entire population of Delhi to move to Daulatabad, and that only 10% of the migrants survived the journey. Both these claims appear to be exaggerations. According to Isami, this unfortunate situation was a result of God's punishment to the corrupt Muslims.

Despite these defects, Isami's book is a valuable source of information about the political history and social life of 14th century India.
