= Duval Rānī va Khiẓr Khān =

- Author: Amir Khusrau
- Language: Persian
- Subject: love story of princess Deval Devi and prince Khizr Khan
- Genre: masnavi
- Publication date: 1316 (original version)
- Publication place: Delhi

Duval Rānī va Khiẓr Khān, also known as Ashiqa, (Note: Alternative transliterations and titles include Dawal Rani wa Khizar, Dawalrani Khizr Khan, Deval Devi-Khizr Khan, Diwal Rānī-yi Khaḍir Khān, Duwal Rani Khazir Khan, Daul Rani wa Khizr Khan, Dadal Rānī-Khiẓr Khān, Ashiqa, Ashiqah, Ashqiya, Ishqia, Ishqiya, Ishqiyya, and Manshur Shahi.) is a Persian language narrative poem (masnavi) written by Amir Khusrau in the Delhi Sultanate of present-day India. It is a romantic panegyric: the first third part of the poem describes the Delhi Sultans and their conquests; the rest of the text narrates the romance between prince Khizr Khan and Deval Devi. The historicity of the romantic part has been questioned by several modern scholars who regard it as historical fiction; others consider it to be a poetic narration of true events.

== Background ==
Amir Khusrau, the author of the text, was a royal court poet of the Delhi Sultanate. Khizr Khan, a subject of the poem, was a son of the Delhi Sultan Alauddin Khalji and the official heir apparent. Both men were followers of the Sufi saint Nizamuddin Auliya, and appear to have known each other outside of the royal court. According to the poem, its other protagonist Deval Devi was a princess of Gujarat: her mother Kamala Devi had been captured and married to Alauddin after the defeat of the Gujarat king Karna, and she herself was captured and married to Khizr Khan sometime later.

According to the poem, Khizr Khan wrote a Hindi language draft describing his courtship and marriage to Deval Devi. Khusrau calls this draft a "dībācha (preface) of love", but does not mention if it was complete text or just outline, or if it was verse or prose. In the autumn of 1314, Khizr Khan showed this draft to Khusrau, requesting him to adapt it into a poem in Persian, the official language of the court. The request provided Khusrau an opportunity to cement his position in the future Sultan's court while writing romantic poetry.

It took Khusrau over four months to write the poem, and he completed the first version of the poem on 1 February 1316. This version was 4,200 verses long, and ended with the marriage of Khizr Khan and Deval Devi. After Khizr Khan was killed by his brother Qutbuddin, Khusrau added 319 lines to the original text, describing the prince's final, tragic days. Khusaru does not mention the date of this addition; since it describes Qutbuddin as "cruel", it was likely made after Qutbuddin's reign, possibly during reign of Ghiyasuddin Tughlaq. The entire poem thus contains 4519 verses. According to editor Rashid Ahmad Salim Ansari, three of the original verses have been lost, and replaced with interpolations.

== Content ==
The first third part of the poem describes the Delhi Sultans and their conquests. The rest of the text narrates the romance between prince Khizr Khan and Deval Devi.

=== Description of the Delhi Sultanate ===
Like his other works, Khusrau begins the poem by praising the Muslim God Allah (describing him as the creator of beauty and love), the Prophet Muhammad, and the Companions of the Prophet. The next few verses praise the Sufi saint Nizamuddin Auliya, followed by a longer praise of Sultan Alauddin Khalji. Khusrau then lectures the Sultan on justice and morality, and warns him against the consequences of tyranny, injustice, and alcoholism.

Khusrau then describes Hindustan and its conquest by Muslims, stating that the Ghurid king Muizzuddin established the throne of Delhi for propagation of Islam in Hindustan. He then covers the reigns of the Delhi Sultans, including Qutubddin, Shamsuddin Iltutmish, Ruknuddin, Raziyya, Ghiyasuddin Balban, and Jalaluddin. Apart from the reigning king Alauddin, the most number of verses are dedicated to Jalaluddin, Balban, and Raziyya. The poem includes 37 verses about Khusrau's former patron Jalaluddin, praising him as a victorious, just, and generous ruler.

Khusrau mentions Alauddin's achievements before he became the Sultan, such as his raid on Devagiri as the governor of Kara. He does not mention anything about Alauddin's assassination of Jalaluddin, although he describes Alauddin's subsequent showering of gold and jewels on a crowd to win public support, and his march to Delhi to claim the throne. He describes Alauddin's reign as peaceful and prosperous, and mentions that a unity of belief prevailed among (the Muslim) people of India. He provides an account of his military conquests, including those against the Mongols and in South India.

=== Love story of Deval and Khizr ===
The second part of the text begins with capture of Deval and her first meeting with Alauddin's son Khizr Khan. Khusrau describes Deval as extraordinarily beautiful. He mentions that the Hindi name of the princess was "Deval", but he calls her "Duval" because "duval is the plural of daulat (wealth) and all fortunes were gathered in her". (Note: The Sanskrit name of the princess was probably "Devalla Devī". At one place, Khusrau also calls her Dadal because "Dadal sounds like the collection of kingdoms", and since she is "the master of riches and desires", her name is "even greater than the collection of those kingdoms".) He states that he would call his work "Duval Rani - Khizr Khan", following the title of the story of Laila-Majnu.

Khusrau recounts Alauddin's victories, which are also described in his prose text, the Khaza'in al-Futuh. These include the raids on raid on Devagiri, Somnath and Malwa; the conquests of Ranthambore, Chittor, Mandu, and Siwana (incorrectly called "Samana"); the second subjugation of Devagiri; the southern victories against Telangana, Hoysalas, and Ma'bar; and the "dismantling of the golden Hindu temple".

Khusrau then introduces Khizr for a second time, stating that although he had not fought a battle, he inherited his father's victories. It is possible that the first introduction was invented by Khusrau, while the second one came from Khizr's draft. After a romantic ghazal, Khusrau again describes Delhi army's victory at Somnath in 1299. He then continues the narrative as follows:

When the Delhi army led by Alauddin's brother Ulugh Khan advanced towards Somnath in Gujarat, the local king Karn Rai (Karna) fled and sought asylum from the neighbouring king Ram-deo of Deogir (Rama-deva of Devagiri). The Delhi army captured his treasure, elepahnts, his wife Kanval-di (Kamala Devi), and her attendants. Kamala Devi's daughter Deval was six months and 14 days old at the time, and was left in Gujarat. Kanval entered the harem of Alauddin, and according to Khusrau, fell in love with Alauddin. She missed her daughter, and a few years later, when Alauddin was thinking of arranging Khizr's marriage, she proposed her daughter as a candidate. Alauddin then ordered as second invasion of Gujarat to capture the princess.

Meanwhile, Karn had regained control of Gujarat. When the Delhi army neared Gujarat, he again sought asylum with Ram-deo. This time, Ram-deo asked Deval to be married to his son in exchange for providing asylum to Karn. (Note: The proposal was for Deval's marriage to prince Shankar-deva (or Singhana-deva); the bearer of the proposal was his brother Bhima-deva (apparently a mistake for Bhilama-deva).) When the wedding processing was on its way to Ram-deo's capital Deogir, the Delhi forces attacked it, captured Deval, and sent her to Delhi.

How sweet it is for two souls
to be smitten in the prime of youth.
Now to reveal the secret with one's brows,
now to begin to scold with one's lashes.
To summon the lover with the corner of the eye
and to send him away with an air of disdain.

— Amir Khusrau in Duval Rānī va Khiẓr Khān, translated by Sunil Sharma

At Delhi, Deval was reunited with her mother. Sultan Alauddin agreed to a marriage between 8-year old Deval and 10-year old Khizr. When the prince's mother, the queen Malika Jahan, informed him about the proposal, he felt embarrassed and left the room, but he had fallen in love with the princess. Deval was happy too, because the prince resembled her brother, whom she missed a lot. The Sultan received reports of their romance, but one day, he and the queen decided to arrange the prince's marriage to a daughter of the queen's brother Alp Khan. The women of the palace tried to convince the queen to let Khizr and Deval marry, but the queen did not relent.

Khizr and Deval continued to meet secretly with help of their confidants. The prince's confidants included three maids and a slave. The princess' confidants included three maids and a harem eunuch. When the queen discovered their secret, she ordered the princess to be sent away to the Red Palace, but later withdrew the order. Before the withdrawal, the prince came to know about the order, and fainted and cried. The prince later came to know that the princess was still at the palace. The two continued to exchange messages, and once, met secretly at night. When the queen became aware of their continued romance, she actually sent the princess away to the Red Palace.

Khizr was married to Alp Khan's daughter in a grand wedding, (Note: The wedding took place on 4 February 1312.) but he stayed away from his bride, and sorrowfully longed for Deval. Meanwhile, Deval learned that the prince had married Alp Khan's daughter, and sent him a resentful letter describing her pitiful condition. The prince replied reassuring her that he loves only her, and described his own misery. One night, the princess dreamed of the prince telling her that they would be reunited. Meanwhile, the prince prayed for their reunion, and a voice from the "unseen world" told him this would happen soon. The prince sent a friend to his mother, requesting her not to let her bias towards her niece surpass the well-being of the prince. The queen finally relented, and Khizr and Deval were married. (Note: Compared to the earlier wedding, Khusrau describes this wedding ceremony briefly, which suggests it may have been a low-key affair.) After a night of love-making with his new wife, the prince offered his prayers to express his gratefulness.

The original version of the text ends here.

=== Tragic end ===
Khusrau's addition to the original poem describes Khizr Khan's tragic end as follows:

Sometime later, the Sultan became seriously ill, and the prince vowed to walk to Sufi shrines if the Sultan regained his health. When the Sultan's condition improved, the prince started a pilgrimage to a Sufi shrine in Hastinapur. In his absence, Malik Kafur started poisoning Alauddin's mind, and possibly, his body. According to Khusrau, Khizr had committed two misdeeds: he had forgotten to seek blessings of the Sufi saint Nizamuddin Auliya, and he had resorted to merrymaking. On the way to the pilgrimage, he developed blisters on his feet, and was persuaded to ride a horse for the remainder of the journey. Meanwhile, Malik Kafur instigated the Sultan against Khizr and Alp Khan (who was later killed). Kafur convinced the Sultan to send a royal letter ordering the prince to return his royal insignia. Although saddened by the order, the naive prince complied. At Delhi, the prince reconciled with his father, but Kafur convinced the Sultan to detain the prince at the Gwalior Fort for a month. The Sultan agreed on the condition that the prince would not be harmed.

Khizr, along with his brothers, was imprisoned at the Gwalior Fort. Deval accompanied him: the couple comforted and entertained each other with songs and stories. Sometime later, the Sultan died, and Malik Kafur started ruling as the regent. He sent his slave Malik Sumbul to blind the princes, which would render them unable to rule. Deval remained devoted to her husband and nursed him. In 1316, Malik Kafur was assassinated and Khizr's step-brother Mubarak Shah became the new king. Mubarak Shah had heard of Deval's beauty, and demanded that Khizr surrender her as a slave. Khizr angrily rejected the demand, stating that Deval was the only wealth he had, and he would rather die than giving her up. Angered by this reply, Mubarak Shah sent a man to kill his brothers, in 1318. The executioner first killed Khizr's younger brother Shadi Khan, and then killed Khizr. (Note: Henry Miers Elliot's translation incorrectly states that during this episode, Deval was wounded and other ladies of Khizr's harem were killed; Khusrau's text does not mention anything like this.) Khizr was buried in the Vijay temple in the Gwalior Fort, and Deval mourned his death.

Khusrau does not describe about Deval's fate after Khizr's death. Like his other poems, Khusrau the concludes with comments on the morality of the world affairs, and talks about his own life as a poet.

== Style ==
The poem is written in the hexametric Hazaj meter, and uses several words of Indian origin. Khusrau mislabels some sections of the poem as ghazal, while using the masnavi form for verses. Possibly, the sections were labeled as ghazal in Khizr Khan's draft, and Khusrau retained the label even after he rewrote the text in masnavi form.

== Critical editions and translations ==
Rashid Ahmad Salim Ansari prepared a critical edition of the text in 1917, based on over a dozen manuscripts. Based on Ansari's work, K. A. Nizami edited Duwal Rani Khazir Khān (1988), which modern scholars use as the standard text.

English civil servant and historian Henry Miers Elliot (1808-1853) partially translated the poem, focusing on historically important parts, but his translation is often "very incorrect". Sunil Sharma (2011) translated a few verses with a prose summary of the entire text.

== Historicity ==
Until the 20th century, the historicity of the poem remained largely unquestioned. Abdul Malik Isami's Futuh-us-Salatin (1350) contains a historical account of Deval-devi and Khizr Khan, as an abridgement of Khusrau's poem. ʽAbd al-Qadir Badayuni's Muntakhab-ut-Tawarikh presents the poem's narrative as history. Firishta, another 16th century historian, adds several details to the narrative, such as the conversion of Kamala-devi to Islam, the capture of Deval-devi at Ellora, (Note: According to Firishta, Malik Naib and Khwaja Haji led the campaign that led to the capture of Deval Devi in 1306.) the marriage of Deval-devi to Qutbuddin after Khizr Khan's murder, and Khusrau Khan's inclusion of Deval-devi in his harem after Qutubddin's murder. History books of colonial British India, such as the Henry Miers Elliot's The History of India, present Firishta's details as history in their works. Mohammad Wahid Mirza, in his thesis The Life And Works Of Amir Khusrau (1929), writes about Khusrau's poem: "...all the characters in it are real persons whom the poet knew familiarly, and he had seen with his own eyes all the incidents he describes [...] The facts of history narrated with great fidelity...".

Historian G. H. Ojha challenged this view after a survey of sources, and concluded that the story of Deval Devi and Khizr Khan was fictional. He theorized that Khusrau borrowed the name Deval-devi from the name of the daughter of Hammira-deva of Ranthambore (according to texts such as Hammira Mahakavya and Hammira Raso, Alauddin offered a ceasefire in exchange for Hammira-deva's daughter.) Historian K. R. Qanungo (1939) similarly described the poem as belonging to the same category as Yusuf and Zulaikha and Farhad and Shirin. Several later scholars, incluidng K. M. Munshi, came to same conclusion and declared the love story of Deval and Khizr to be fictional. Others, such as Banarsi Prasad Saksena, believe that while Khusrau may have used poetic license at places, the poem is based on historical events.

Arguments supporting the love story's historicity include the following:

- Several later historians mention Deval: minor divergences in their accounts should not be used to deny her existence. Some historians such as Yahya may have omitted the love story from their descriptions of the period, as they were writing political history and the private life of a politically unimportant figure like Khizr Khan not of much significance to them.
- Ziauddin Barani (1285–1357) states that the Delhi army captured Karna's wife and daughters during their Gujarat invasion: he may have omitted the other details because Khusrau had already written about them.
- The poem contains fairly accurate descriptions of several historical events, including Muizzuddin's conquests in India, the Mamluk reign, and the Khalji reign.
- The poet may have used his imagination to describe the romantic attraction between 8-year old Deval and 10-year old Khizr when they first met (c. 1305). They may have been friends who liked each other, and this friendship must have developed into passionate love in the later years. Khusrau would not have dared to exploit the name of the crown prince Khizr Khan for a fictional love story.

Arguments in favor of considering the poem's love story as fictional include the following:

- Barani describes Khusrau as a great poet, writer, and a musician, but does not suggest that he was known for historical works.
- Khusrau's earlier work Khazain ul-Futuh contains an account of the Gujarat invasion, but makes no mention of capture of the Kamala-devi or Deval-devi.
- Later historians such as Nizamuddin Ahmad, Badayuni and Firishta mistakenly considered Khusrau's fictional poetic love story as history, and based their historical accounts on it.
- Alauddin's brother Ulugh Khan died in 1302, but according to Khusrau's poem, he led an invasion of Karna's territory in 1306-1307.
- According to Nizamuddin Ahmad's Tabaqat-i-Akbari (16th century), Deval and other captive daughters of Karna were brought to Delhi in 1299. On the other hand, Khusrau's poem claims that Deval was captured during the second invasion of Gujarat.
- According to Khusrau's poem, Khizr Khan embarked upon a pilgrimage to Hastinapur to visit the tomb of a pir. No such tomb is known from other historical sources.
- Khusrau states that Alauddin appointed Khizr Khan as the governor of eastern provinces as far as Amroha, and instructed him to conquer the hill territories. No other chronicler mentions this.
- Wassaf's Tārīkḣ-i Waṣṣāf (c. 1312) contains a fairly detailed account of Alauddin's reign, but makes no mention of the love story of Deval Devi and Khizr Khan.
- Haji-ud-Dabir's Arabic-language history of Gujarat mentions the defeat of Karna against the Delhi army led by Ulugh Khan and Nusrat Khan, and also mentions the capture of his family members, but does not mention anything about the love story of Deval and Khizr Khan.
- Ibn Battuta, who arrived in India in 1333 and lived there for a decade, also provides an account of the Alauddin's reign and subsequent years, including the alleged conspiracy by Khizr Khan's mother to place him the throne with help of her brother Alp Khan, Khizr Khan's imprisonment in the Gwalior Fort, and his subsequent murder. He had personally visited Gwalior, and his account of Khizr Khan's murder was based on the eyewitness account of Zainuddin Mubarak, the qazi of the Fort. Ibn Battuta mentions that Khizr Khan's mother was with her son at Gwalior when he was killed "but the executioners shut the door against her and killed him." He also writes that Khizr Khan's mother lived for several years after her son's murder, and he met her at Mecca in 1327. However, he makes no mention of Kamala Devi, Devala Devi or any other Hindu queens or princesses married to Alauddin or Khizr Khan. Neither does he talk about any wife of Khizr Khan living with him at Gwalior, or being taken to Qutubddin's harem after the murder.
- At the time of her capture, Deval Devi was 8-year and Khizr Khan was 10-year old. Khusrau describes romantic attraction between the two at such a young age, which is hard to believe.
- While Khusrau may have completed the poem earlier, he may have published it only after the end of the Khalji rule, which may explain why he could afford to use the prince's name for a fictional account.
