= Alauddin Khalji's conquest of Gujarat =

1299–1304 Khalji military campaign

- Part of Campaigns of Alauddin Khalji
Date	June 1299–1304
Location	Gujarat
Result	Delhi Sultanate victory: Fall of Vaghelas
Territorial changes	Gujrat annexed by the Delhi Sultanate

Belligerents
Delhi	Vaghela dynasty

Commanders and leaders
Alauddin Khalji; Ulugh Khan; Nusrat Khan	Karna II

Strength
34,000 • 20,000 infantry • 14,000 cavalry	110,000 • 80,000 infantry • 30,000 cavalry

Casualties and losses
Light	Heavy

Locations of the major cities attacked during the 1299 invasion of Gujarat

Alauddin Khalji's conquest of Gujarat, also known as the Muslim conquest of Gujarat, began in 1299 when the Delhi Sultanate ruler Alauddin Khalji sent an army to ransack the Gujarat region of India, which was ruled by the Vaghela king Karna. The Delhi forces plundered several major cities of Gujarat, including Anahilavada (Patan), Khambhat, Surat and Somnath. Karna was able to regain control of at least a part of his kingdom in the later years. However, in 1304, a second invasion by Alauddin's forces permanently ended the Vaghela dynasty, and resulted in the annexation of Gujarat to the Delhi Sultanate.

== Background ==
After becoming the Sultan of Delhi in 1296, Alauddin Khalji spent a few years consolidating his power. Once he had strengthened his control over the Indo-Gangetic plains, he decided to invade Gujarat. According to the Persian historian Wassaf (fl. 1299-1323), Alauddin invaded Gujarat because "the vein of the zeal of religion beat high for the subjection of infidelity and destruction of idols."

Gujarat was one of the wealthiest regions of India, because of its fertile soil and the Indian Ocean trade. Moreover, a large number of Muslim traders lived in the port cities of Gujarat. Alauddin's conquest of Gujarat would make it convenient for the Muslim merchants of north India to participate in international trade.

At that time, Gujarat was ruled by the Vaghela king Karnadeva (called Rai Karan by the Muslim chroniclers). According to the 14th century Jain chronicler Merutunga's Vichara-shreni, Karna's Nagara minister Madhava brought the invaders to Gujarat. The 15th-century text Kanhadade Prabandha also states that the Vaghela king had humiliated Madhava, killed his brother Keshava, and abducted his wife. Seeking revenge, Madhava went to Delhi and urged Alauddin to help him wage a war against the Vaghela king. This account is also supported by the 17th-century chronicler Munhot Nainsi. This account seems to be based on historical truth, and may explain why Alauddin could invade Gujarat without subjugating the kingdoms which acted as a buffer zone between Delhi and Gujarat.

== 1299 invasion ==
=== March to Gujarat ===
On 25 February 1299, Alauddin ordered his army to prepare for the march to Gujarat. According to Wassaf, the army comprised 14,000 cavalry and 20,000 infantry. One section of the army started its march from Delhi, led by Nusrat Khan. Another section, led by Ulugh Khan, marched from Sindh, attacking Jaisalmer along the way. The two sections met somewhere near Chittor, and then marched to Gujarat through Mewar. Different medieval chroniclers given different dates (ranging from 1298 to 1300) for the start of the Delhi army's march. An inscription found at Somnath clearly indicates that a battle took place there in June 1299. Hence, the invasion would have definitely started before this date.

During this march, Alauddin's generals seem to have raided a portion of the Guhila territory of Mewar. The Jain writer Jina Prabha Suri states that the Guhila king Samarasimha protected his territory from Alauddin's forces. The 1439 Ranpur inscription describes one Bhuvanasimha as "the conqueror of Shri Allavadina Sultan". Bhuvanasimha belonged to the Sisodia branch of the Guhilas, and may have served as a feudatory of Samarasimha. The Delhi army did not seem to have suffered any serious reverses against the Guhilas, as they were able to easily capture Gujarat sometime later. It appears that a column of the Delhi army carried out a light raid in the Guhila territory, and met with strong resistance.

After crossing the Banas River, Alauddin's forces captured a fort called Radosa.

=== Invasion ===
The sudden invasion from Delhi appears to have been a surprise for the Vaghela king Karna. Alauddin's army captured Gujarat easily in a very short time, possibly indicating that Karna might have been unpopular among his subjects, or had an ineffective military and administrative setup.

The Jain chronicler Jinaprabha Suri states that Ulugh Khan's forces defeated Karna's army at Asapalli (present-day Ahmedabad).

According to the 14th-century writer Isami, Karna weighed his options: putting up a fight against the invaders or retiring into a fortress. Given his lack of adequate war preparation, his ministers advised him to leave the country and return after the departure of the invaders. Historian A. K. Majumdar interprets Isami's writings to mean that Karna took shelter in a fort, but epigraphist Z. A. Desai notes that no such conclusion can be drawn from Isami's writings.

According to Barani, Karna fled to Devagiri, the capital of the neighbouring Yadava kingdom. However, historian Peter Jackson believes that Barani's statement is inaccurate: Karna fled to Devagiri only during the later 1304 invasion.

=== Plunder and massacre ===
On the third day after Karna fled his capital Anahilavada (modern Patan, called Nahrwala in Muslim chronicles), the invaders arrived in the city. According to Isami, the city abounded in valuable commodities, precious metals, and treasures: the invaders looted these, and also seized seven elephants. Karna's wealth and his wives, including his chief queen Kamala Devi, were captured by the invaders.

According to Jinaprabha, Ulugh Khan and Nusrat Khan destroyed hundreds of towns, including Asapalli (modern Ahmedabad), Vanmanthali and Surat. The invaders also looted several monasteries, palaces and temples. This account is also confirmed by the Delhi Sultanate chronicler Ziauddin Barani. Isami states that the invading soldiers even dug out the treasures hidden underground by the locals.

At the wealthy port city of Khambhat, Nusrat Khan obtained a great amount of wealth from the local merchants and other rich people. There, he also forcibly obtained the slave Malik Kafur, who later became a general of the Delhi Sultanate and led Alauddin's campaigns in Deccan. According to Wassaf, the Muslim army massacred people "unmercifully, throughout the impure land, for the sake of Islam". The invaders plundered gold and silver "to an extent greater than can be conceived", besides a variety of precious stones and textiles. Wassaf summarizes the invasion as follows:

They took captive a great number of handsome and elegant maidens amounting to 20,000, and children of both sexes, more than the pen can enumerate [...] In short, the Muhammadan army brought the country to utter ruin, and destroyed the lives of the inhabitants, and plundered the cities, and captured their offspring, so that many temples were deserted, and the idols were broken and trodden under foot."

— Wassaf

Wassaf also states that the invaders discovered a beautiful jasper-coloured stone with ornamental figures from the ruins of the destroyed temples. This stone was sculptured with verses from the Quran, and placed at the entrance of the tomb shrine of Shaikh Murshid Abu Is'hak Ibrahim bin Shahriar.

=== Desecration of Somnath ===
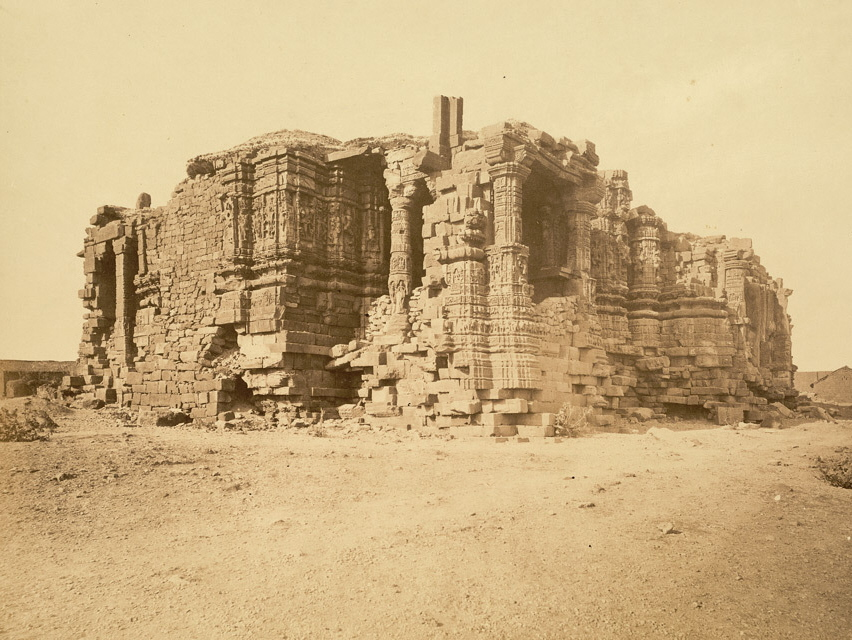
Somnath temple ruins in 1869

One section of the invading army marched towards the reputed Somnath temple, hoping to plunder gold from there. The temple had earlier been destroyed by Mahmud of Ghazni in the 11th century, but had since been re-built.

The Delhi army met with resistance at Somnath. An inscription records that two "Vāja" warriors named Malasuta and Padamala died at the door of the Somanatha temple on 6 June 1299, while fighting the Turushkas (the Turkic people).

After subjugating the defenders, Alauddin's army demolished the temple. According to the contemporary chronicler Amir Khusrau, the temple was bent into the direction of Kaaba (qibla). The invaders looted the temple's wealth, and carried its main idol to Delhi, where its fragments were thrown to be trampled under the feet of Muslims.

Wassaf describes the destruction of the Somnath idol as follows: The idol was adorned with a jewel-studded gold crown and a pearl necklace, and was of "admirable workmanship". After looting the jewels, the Muslim soldiers decided to destroy the idol. The Hindus offered them a thousand pieces of gold to spare the idol, but the soldiers rejected the demand. The invaders cut off its perfumed limbs, destroyed it, and carried its fragments to Delhi. The entrance of the city's Jami Masjid was paved with these fragments.

=== Mutiny near Jalore ===
Nusrat Khan and Ulugh Khan returned to Delhi with a huge amount of wealth and prisoners, including Malik Kafur and the Vaghela queen Kamala Devi. The individual soldiers in the Delhi army had also managed to gather their own loot. When the army halted at Sakarne near Jalore on its way to Delhi, the generals ordered these soldiers to pay khums (one-fifth of the share of loot). Some of the soldiers tried to conceal the true amount of wealth looted by them, leading to disputes. The generals punished several soldiers. According to the 15th-century text Tarikh-i-Mubarak Shahi (written by Yahya), these soldiers were put under bellows, forced to drink saline water, and beaten with fists and rods.

As a result, a section of the army revolted against the generals. The mutineers were mostly "neo-Muslims", the Mongols (Mughals), who had converted to Islam recently. According to the 14th-century historian Isami, the revolt was led by Muhammad Shah, Kabhru, Yalhaq and Burraq. According to the 15th-century historian Yahya, it was led by Iljak, Kasri, Begi, Tamghan, Muhammad Shah, Timur Bagha, Shadi Bugha and Qutlugh Bugha. In Nainsi ri Khyat, the 17th-century chronicler Munhot Nainsi states that three days before the mutiny, the rebel leaders had met Samantasimha, the Chahamana ruler of Jalore. On the day of the mutiny, the rebels attacked the generals' camp from one side, while the Chahamana army attacked it from the other side. The veracity of Nainsi's account is doubtful, as he inaccurately states that Alauddin personally led the Delhi army during this campaign, and was present at the time of the mutiny.

The mutiny began when the rebels murdered Malik A'izzudin, who was a brother of Nusrat Khan and the secretary of Ulugh Khan. The next day, around 2000-3000 of them attacked the camp of Ulugh Khan, who managed to escape, as he was in a lavatory. The attackers killed a son of Alauddin's sister, mistaking him for Ulugh Khan. Ulugh Khan escaped to Nusrat Khan's tent, where drums were beaten to assemble the loyal soldiers. These loyal soldiers forced the rebels to retreat.

The rebellion was completely suppressed within 4 days. The mutiny had terrified the royal generals, who quickly resumed their march to Delhi, without making any further khums demands. Two of the rebel leaders — Muhammad Shah and Kabhru — sought asylum with Hammiradeva, the Chahamana ruler of Ranastambhapura (modern Ranthambore). Two other rebel readers — Yalhaq and Burraq — sought shelter with the Vaghela king Karna.

When Alauddin heard about the mutiny, he ordered the arrests of the wives and children of the mutineers in Delhi. Nusrat Khan meted out especially brutal punishment to the wives and children of the individuals who had murdered his brother A'izzudin. The children were cut into pieces in front of their mothers, who were raped, humiliated and forced into prostitution. These brutal punishments shocked the chronicler Ziauddin Barani, who declared that no religion allowed such acts. According to him, the practice of punishing wives and children for the crimes of men started with this incident in Delhi.

== 1304 invasion ==
Karna seems to have recaptured at least a part of his former territory in the later years. An inscription found at the Sampla village in Gujarat attests that he was ruling at Patan on 4 August 1304. The Jain author Merutunga also states that he ruled up to 1304 CE.

The 14th century Muslim chronicler Isami also suggests that Karna managed to regain his power. According to Isami, Alauddin had handed over the administration of the newly captured Ranthambore Fort to Malik Shahin in 1301. But sometime later, Malik Shahin fled the fort because he was afraid of Karna, who ruled the neighbouring territory. Karna was supported by the neo-Muslim Mongol amirs, who had rebelled against Alauddin's generals at Jalore.

=== Accounts of various chroniclers ===
According to Amir Khusrau's poem Ashiqa, Karna and his queen Kamala Devi had a daughter named Devala Devi ("Dewal Di"). After the 1299 invasion, Kamala Devi was taken to Delhi, and inducted into Alauddin's harem. Eight years later, she requested Alauddin to get Devala Devi from Gujarat. Alauddin sent a message to Karna, and Karna agreed to oblige. He was preparing to send Devala Devi to Delhi with many presents, but then he came to know that a large Delhi army led by Ulugh Khan and Panchami had been sent to conquer Gujarat. He then sought asylum from the Yadava prince Shankaradeva ("Sankh Deo"), a son of Ramachandra of Devagiri ("Ram Deo"). Shankaradeva agreed to help him, but on the condition that he would marry Devala Devi. Karna unwillingly accepted the condition. But before he could send her to Devagiri, Panchami's army captured her. She was sent to Delhi, where fell in love with the 10-year old Khizr Khan. Despite objections from Khizr Khan's mother, the two later married.

The 14th-century chronicler Isami gives a slightly different account of events. According to him, Alauddin's forces returned to Delhi after plundering Gujarat, and Karna re-occupied his capital. Later, Alauddin sent an army led by Malik Ahmad Jhitam (alias Qara Beg) and an officer named Panchmani. When the invading army arrived at Patan, Karna fled to the Yadava kingdom ("Marhat" or Maharashtra), leaving behind his family and his army. However, he failed to find asylum there, and moved on to the Kakatiya kingdom ("Tilang" or Telangana). The Kakatiya ruler Rudradeva ("Luddar Dev") granted him asylum. Meanwhile, Malik Jhitam returned to Delhi with the wives and daughters of Karna, including Devala Devi. Alauddin granted Gujarat as an iqta' to his brother-in-law Alp Khan, who came from Multan and became the governor of Gujarat. Isami does not mention Kamala Devi.

Ziauddin Barani, another 14th-century chronicler, does not mention the second invasion in his Tarikh-i-Firuz Shahi. He states that Ulugh Khan and Nusrat Khan plundered Gujarat, after Karna fled to the Devagiri. The two generals later returned to Delhi with the wives and daughters of Karna. Barani, however, does not mention Devala Devi's name. Another medieval writer Nizam ud-Din gives a similar account, and mentions the capture of Devala Devi ("Dewal"). But he ignores the rest of the Ashiqa narrative. Like Isami, he does not mention Kamala Devi at all.

The 16th-century historian `Abd al-Qadir Bada'uni follows Barani's account, but presents a part of the Ashiqa account as history, but does not mention Kamala Devi. Bada'uni's contemporary Firishta combines all the previous accounts to present the following narrative: the first invasion of Gujarat was led by Alauddin's generals Aluf Khan (Alp Khan) and Nusrat Khan. They captured Kamala Devi ("Kowla Devy") and other wives and daughters of Karna, who sought shelter with Ramachandra of Devagiri. With Ramachandra's help, Karna became the ruler of a principality called Baglana, located on the border of the Yadava territory. In 1308, Alauddin sent Malik Kafur to subjugate Ramachandra. At this time, Kamala Devi requested him to bring her daughter Devala Devi ("Deval Devy") to Delhi. Malik Kafur reached Deccan, and asked Karna to surrender Devala Devi. However, Karna refused to do so and warded off the invaders in the mountain passes for two months. Ultimately, he decided to marry his daughter to Ramachandra's son Shankaradeva ("Shunkul Dev"). While an officer named Bhimadeva ("Bhim Deo") was escorting Devala to Shankaradeva, some Muslim soldiers visiting Ellora chanced upon his contingent. The Muslim soldiers captured Devala Devi, and took her to Aluf Khan. Ultimately, Devala Devi was sent to Delhi, where she married Khizr Khan.

=== Historical accuracy ===
The most accurate among all these accounts seems to be that of Isami, who spent considerable time in the Deccan region. Amir Khusrau's Ashiqa, which is of little historical value, states that the second invasion was led by Ulugh Khan (not Malik Jhitam). However, if the dates given by the 16th-century historian Firishta are accepted as correct, Ulugh Khan had already died by this time. On the other hand, Isami states that the invasion was led by Malik Jhitam.

The Ashiqa states that a mother Kamala Devi asked Alauddin to snatch her young daughter from her biological father. It goes on to claim that Karna not only readily agreed to this demand, but also decided to send some presents with her to Delhi. These claims, which imply that the Vaghelas had no sense of honour and chastity, seem absurd. Even Bada'uni, who placed a high value on the historicity of Ashiqa, chose to ignore these claims in his writings. Firishta also refused to repeat Khsurau's statement that Karna was preparing to send presents with his daughter to Delhi. Similarly, Khusrau's claim that Devala Devi fell in love with her father's biggest enemy seems unlikely.

Also, it is unlikely that the Yadava king Ramachandra granted refuge to Karna. The Yadavas were enemies of the Chaulukyas-Vaghelas. Moreover, Ramachandra paid tribute to Alauddin in 1299, and some years later, even supported Alauddin's forces in their campaign against his other enemies, such as the Hoysalas. Considering all these points, Isami's statement that Karna had to seek refuge from the Kakatiyas seems correct.

== See also ==
- Gujarat under Delhi Sultanate
