= Capture of Jhain =

1291 battle between the Delhi Sultanate and the Rajputs

| Date | March 1291 |
| Location | Jhain, Kingdom of Ranthambore (modern-day Rajasthan) 25.89077°N 76.48234°E |
| Result | Delhi Sultanate victory |
| Territorial changes | Jhain captured by Delhi Sultanate |

Belligerents
| Delhi Sultanate | Chauhans of Ranthambore |

Commanders and leaders
| Jalaluddin Khalji | Gurdan Saini † |

Strength
| 1,000 | 10,000 |

Casualties and losses
| Unknown | Unknown |
- Jhain on Map Jhain (Rajasthan)

The Capture of Jhain was a military expedition carried out by the Delhi Sultanate under Jalal-ud-din Khalji against the Kingdom of Ranthambore. It took place in the March of 1291 when the Delhi forces defeated the Ranthambore forces under Gurdan Saini and captured the city of Jhain.

The Delhi army consisted of around 1,000 men, while the Ranthambore forces had 10,000. Most of the Rajputs, including their leader, Gurdan Saini, were killed in the battle. Jalaluddin Khalji marched through Jhain after the victory of the battle. The remaining Rajputs in Jhain evacuated the fort and retreated.

== Background and aftermath ==
Jalal-ud-din Khalji became ruler of the Delhi Sultanate in 1290. He captured the Mandawar fort in 1291 after defeating the Rajputs. After the victory at Mandawar, he marched towards Ranthambore to capture it from the Chauhans. Hammiradeva, the ruler of Ranthambore, sent his general Gurdan Saini to resist the invasion. Gurdan Saini took 10,000 Rawats from Jhain and marched towards the Delhi army.

Jalaluddin dispatched an army of 1,000, consisting of Malik Khurram, Malik Qutlagh Tighin, Azam Mubarak, Amir Narnul, Ahmad Sarjandar, Mahmud Sarjandar, and Abaji Akhurbeg. The Delhi army defeated the Ranthambore troops, and Gurdan Saini was killed in the battle. After facing high casualties, Ranthambore forces in Jhain evacuated the fort and retreated. Jalaluddin entered Jhain and continued his march towards Ranthambore.
