= Alauddin Khalji's conquest of Devagiri =

1308 Khalji military campaign

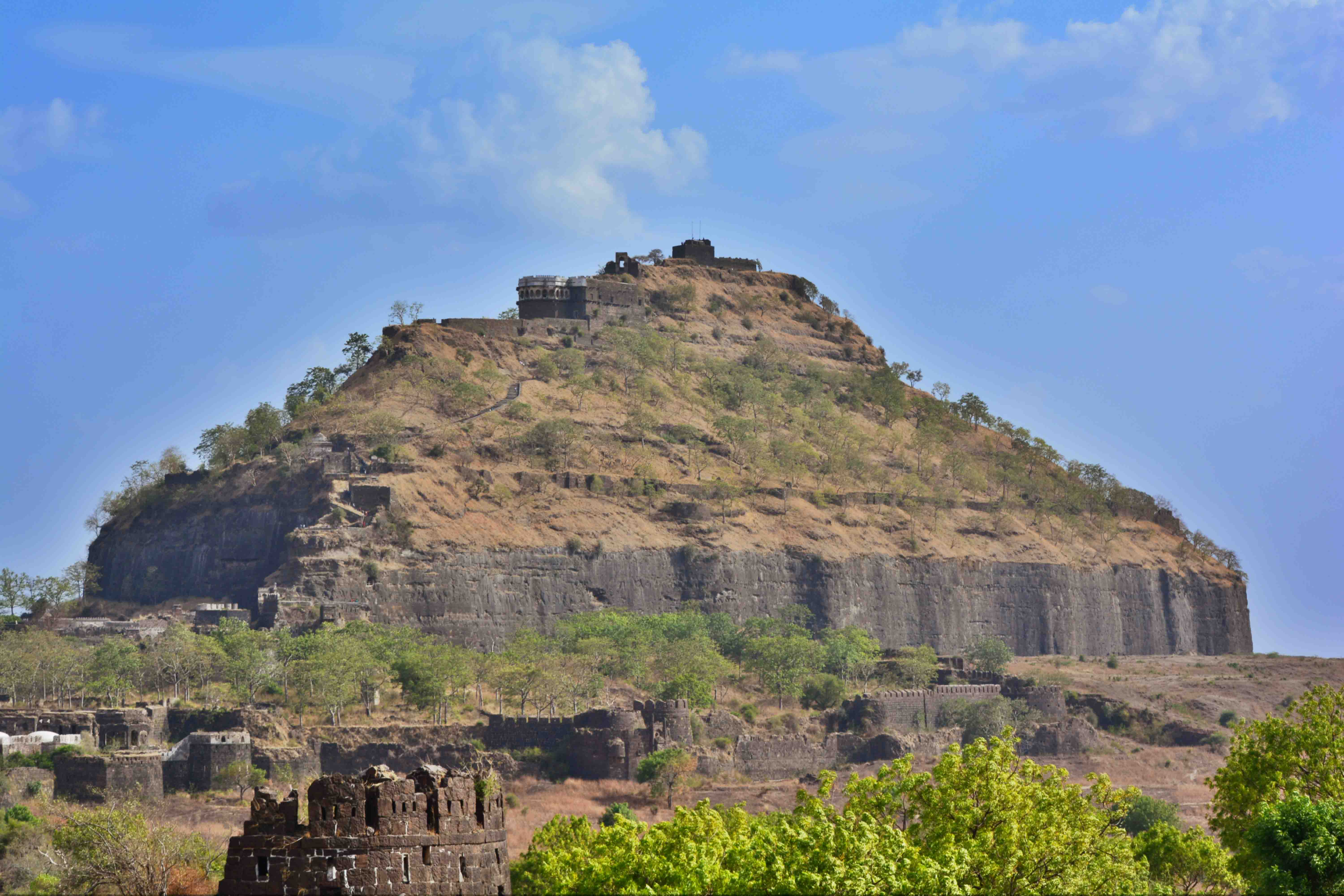
- The Ruins of Devagiri fort
Date	1308
Location	Devagiri
Result	Khalji victory

Belligerents
Seuna (Yadava) dynasty	Delhi Sultanate

Commanders and leaders
Ramachandra	Alauddin Khalji; Malik Kafur

Delhi and Devagiri in present-day India

The conquest of Devagiri occurred around 1308, after the Delhi Sultanate ruler Alauddin Khalji sent a large army led by his general Malik Kafur to Devagiri, the capital of the Yadava king Ramachandra.

Alauddin had earlier raided Devagiri in 1296, and forced Ramachandra to pay him tribute. However, Ramachandra had discontinued tribute payments, and had given asylum to the Vaghela king Karna, whom Alauddin had ousted from Gujarat in 1304.

A section of the Delhi army, commanded by Alp Khan, invaded Karna's principality in the Yadava kingdom, and captured the Vaghela princess Devaladevi, who later married Alauddin's son Khizr Khan. Another section, commanded by Malik Kafur captured Devagiri after a weak resistance by the defenders. Ramachandra agreed to become a vassal of Alauddin, and later, aided Malik Kafur in the Sultanate's invasions of the southern kingdoms.

== Date ==
There is some confusion over the date of Alauddin's second invasion of Devagiri. His courtier Amir Khusrau dates this invasion to March 1307, but describes it after the Siege of Siwana, which occurred in 1308. The 16th century writer Firishta dates the Devagiri campaign to 1306, but states that it happened in the same year as the Siege of Siwana.

The near-contemporary writer Ziauddin Barani dates the invasion to 1308, which according to historian Kishori Saran Lal, appears to be correct.

== Causes of 1308 invasion ==
The Yadava king Ramachandra had agreed to pay an annual tribute after Alauddin's 1296 raid of the Yadava capital Devagiri. However, in the mid-1300s, he stopped sending the tribute, as Alauddin remained occupied with his campaigns in northern India. As a result, Alauddin sent a force led by his general Malik Kafur to subjugate Ramachandra. According to the 14th-century chronicler Isami, the decision of not paying the tribute was that of Ramachandra's son and his associates: Ramachandra himself remained loyal to Alauddin, and even appealed the Sultan to punish his son, resulting in Malik Kafur's invasion. This seems true, because according to Amir Khusrau's Khazainul Futuh, Alauddin ordered his army not to harm Ramachandra and his family during the invasion.

According to some medieval writers, another reason for this campaign was the pursuit of the Vaghela princess Devaladevi. During his 1299 invasion of Gujarat, Alauddin had captured the Vaghela queen Kamaladevi, who later was forced to marry him in Delhi. In 1304, Alauddin annexed Gujatat to the Delhi Sultanate, forcing the Vaghela king Karna to flee to the Yadava kingdom, where Ramachandra gave Karna the principality of Baglana. According to the 16th-century historian Firishta, Kamaladevi requested Alauddin to bring her daughter Devaladevi to Delhi.

Ziauddin Barani mentions that Malik Kafur invaded Devagiri on his way to the Kakatiya capital Warangal, but this is not correct. Malik Kafur returned to Delhi after his conquest of Devagiri, and invaded the Kakatiaya kingdom at a later time.

== March to the Yadava kingdom ==
Alauddin had thought of selecting Malik Shahin, the former governor of Chittor, as the commander of the Devagiri campaign. However, Malik Shahin had earlier fled Chittor fearing a Vaghela resurgence in the neighbouring territory of Gujarat. Therefore, Alauddin selected another general - Malik Kafur - to lead the invasion of Devagiri.

According to Firishta, Alauddin took special care to ensure that all the officers participating in the campaign obeyed Malik Kafur. He sent his royal canopy and pavilion with Kafur, and ordered his officers to pay respects to him daily. These officers included Sirajuddin Khwaja Haji, the minister of war, who held immediate charge of the army. The Malwa governor Ainul Mulk Multani and the Gujarat governor Alp Khan were ordered to extend all possible support to Kafur.

Malik Kafur assembled a 30,000-strong cavalry at Tilpat near Delhi, and then marched towards Devagiri via Dhar. His army was reinforced by the forces of Khavaja Haji, Ainul Mulk Multani and Alp Khan. After crossing Malwa, Malik Kafur sent Alp Khan to Baglana to capture Devaladevi forcefully, while he himself marched to Devagiri.

== Baglana ==
In the past, Ramachandra's son Simhana had offered to marry Karna's daughter Devaladevi, but Karna had refused this proposal. As Alp Khan invaded Baglana, Karna found himself in a difficult situation, and agreed to marry his daughter to Simhana. Devaladevi was sent on a journey to Devagiri, escorted by a small party under Simhana's brother Bhillama.

According to one account, soon after Devaladevi's departure, Alp Khan defeated Karna in a battle. Karna fled towards Devagiri, pursued by the Delhi forces. He was denied asylum at Devagiri, and ultimately, had to seek shelter from the Kakatiyas in Warangal. Meanwhile, Bhillama's party was intercepted by a contingent of Alp Khan's army. Devaladevi's horse was wounded by arrow, and she was captured by Dilawar Panchami, an officer of Alp Khan. She was taken to Alp Khan, who sent her to Delhi.

Firishta offers a slightly different account of Devaladevi's capture. According to him, Simhana had sent Bhillama to escort Devaladevi without Ramachandra's permission. Alp Khan was unable to find Karna in Baglana, and retired to a riverbank, where his army rested for two days. There, around 300-400 of his soldiers took his permission to visit the famous Ellora Caves. During this journey, these soldiers encountered Bhima's party escorting Devaladevi to Devagiri. They defeated Bhillama, captured Devaladevi, and took her to Alp Khan.

== Devagiri ==
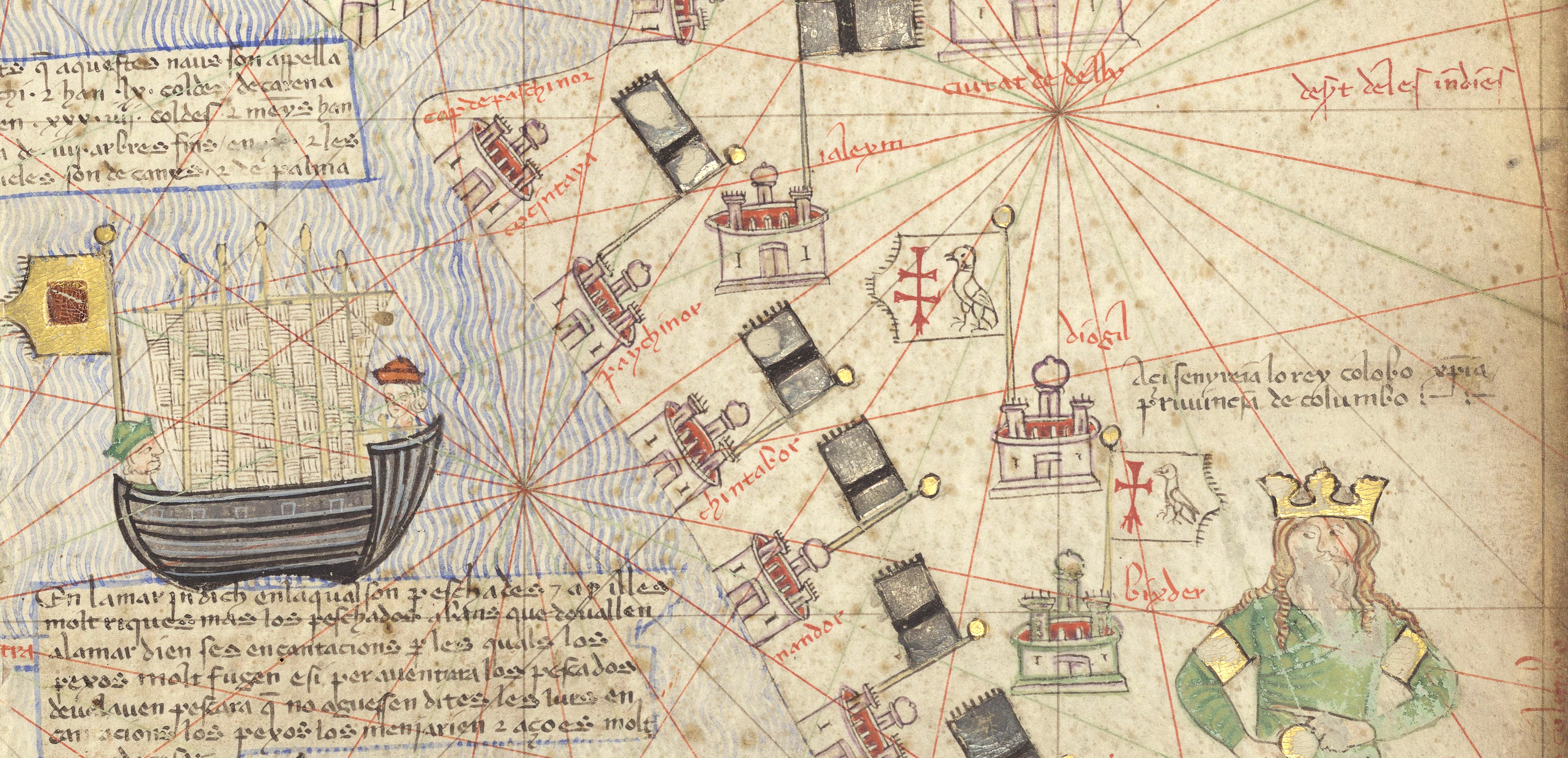
Western coast of India, with the traditional Yadava capital of Diogil ("Deogiri", or Devagiri) at the center, in the Catalan Atlas (1375). On top of the city of Diogil floats a peculiar flag, while coastal cities are under the black flag of the Delhi Sultanate. Devagiri was ultimately captured by Alauddin Khalji in 1307. The trading ship raises the flag of the Ilkhanate.

Meanwhile, at Devagiri, the defenders offered a weak resistance, and Malik Kafur achieved an easy victory. According to Isami, Kafur plundered Devagiri, but Firishta states that Kafur did not harm the general public. Historian Banarsi Prasad Saksena believes Isami to be incorrect.

Amir Khusrau states that the defending army split into two sections: one section led by Ramachandra surrendered, while another section led by his son Bhillama fled. Ramachandra left his son Simhana (or Singhana) at Devagiri, and then came to meet Kafur.

== In Delhi ==
Kafur took Ramachandra and his family to Delhi to personally acknowledge Alauddin's suzerainty. In Delhi, Alauddin treated Ramachandra well, and honoured him with the title Rai Rayan. According to Barani, Alauddin gave him 100,000 gold tankas (coins), and the principality of Navsari in Gujarat. According to Haji-ud-dabir, Alauddin chided Malik Kafur for misbehaving with Ramachandra, and the Yadava king had voluntarily submitted to Alauddin.

According to Isami, Ramachandra also gave his daughter Jhatyapali in marriage to Alauddin. The 14th-century Persian historian Wassaf, in his Tajziyat al-amsar, also mentions that the ruler of Devagiri gave his daughter to Alauddin to save his life. Historian Kishori Saran Lal believes that Ramachandra gave his daughter to Alauddin after the 1296 raid, but historian Satish Chandra states that this probably happened after the second expedition. This daughter is alternatively called Chhitai, Jhitai, Jethapali or Kshetrapali in various historical texts. Isami states that she was the mother of Alauddin's son and successor Shihab-ud-din Omar. The 16th-century historian Firishta claims that after Alauddin's death, his viceroy Malik Kafur married Ramachandra's daughter. Chhitai Varta (c. 1440), a Hindi poem by Narayan-das, narrates her legend.

Ramachandra stayed at Delhi for six months. By the end of 1308, he came back to Devagiri, where he ruled as a vassal of Alauddin. He remained loyal to Alauddin till his death, and helped his army carry out the subsequent southern campaigns of Warangal and Dwarasamudra.

Ramachandra appears to have died sometime in 1311, although the exact date of his death is not certain. The Nala inscription, his last extant inscription, is dated 1311 CE (1233 Shaka).

== 1313 invasion ==
In 1313, probably at his own request, Malik Kafur led another expedition to Devagiri, against Ramachandra's successor Simhana III (or Shankaradeva). He defeated and killed him for unsuccessfully rebelling against Alauddin Khalji., and annexed Devagiri to the Delhi Sultanate. Kafur remained in Devagiri as governor of the newly annexed territory for two years, until he was urgently summoned to Delhi when Alauddin's health began deteriorating.

== 1317 invasion ==
After Malik Kafur was recalled to Delhi, Ayn al-Mulk Multani acted as the governor of Devagiri, but later, he too was recalled to crush a rebellion in Gujarat.

Taking advantage of this, the Yadavas seized Devagiri, and declared their independence. They were led by Harapaladeva (or Hirpal), who was probably a son-in-law of the former Yadava monarch Ramachandra, and his prime minister Raghava (or Raghu).

In April 1317, during the second year of his reign, Qutbuddin Mubarak Shah marched to Devagiri with a large army. When the army reached Devagiri, all the local chiefs except Raghava and Harapaladeva accepted Mubarak Shah's suzerainty without offering any resistance.

Raghava and his nearly 10,000-strong cavalry, as well as Harapaladeva, fled to the hilly region near Devagiri. The Delhi generals Khusrau Khan and Malik Qutlugh (who held the title amir-i shikar) led an army to pursue them. The Delhi forces completely routed Raghava's army. Khusrau Khan dispatched a force led by amir-i koh Malik Ikhtiyaruddin Talbagha (son of Yaghda) to pursue Harapaladeva, who was wounded and captured after 2-3 skirmishes. Harapaladeva was presented before Mubarak Shah, who ordered his beheading. The body of Harapaladeva was hung at the gates of Devagiri.

Mubarak Shah spent some time consolidating his rule in Deccan. Malik Yaklakhi, who had served as Alauddin's Naib-i-Barid-i-Mumalik, was appointed as the governor of Devagiri.

== Aftermath ==
Ramachandra had two other sons, Ballala and Bhima (also called Bimba or Bhillama). Of these, Bhima escaped to Konkan, where he established a base at Mahikavati (modern Mahim in Mumbai).

In 1328, Sultan Muhammad bin Tughlaq moved his capital to Devagiri and renamed it as Daulatabad. It came under the control of Bahmani Sultanate in 1347. It became the secondary capital of Ahmadnagar Sultanate in 1499. Mughals captured the region in 1632. In 1795, the region came under the Maratha rule, following the Maratha victory over the Nizam of Hyderabad in the Battle of Kharda.
