= Revenue reforms of Alauddin Khalji =

Administrative organization of Alauddin Khilji (c. 1296–1316)

The Delhi Sultanate ruler Alauddin Khalji (r. 1296-1316) implemented a series of major fiscal, land and agrarian reforms in northern India. He re-designated large areas of land as crown territory by confiscating private properties and by annulling land grants. He imposed a 50% kharaj tax on the agricultural produce, and ordered his ministry to collect the revenue directly from the peasants by eliminating the intermediary village chiefs.

Alauddin had faced conspiracies and rebellions by Hindu chiefs in rural areas during his early reign. Besides ensuring sufficient revenues for the royal treasury, the objective of these reforms was to subjugate the powerful chiefs and nobles who could challenge Alauddin's authority. According to chronicler Ziauddin Barani, he also asked his advisers for reforms to subjugate the Hindus whose wealth was a "source of rebellion and disaffection" like the nobility.

Most of Alauddin's reforms were revoked by his son Qutbuddin Mubarak Shah shortly after his death, but a few of them served as a basis for the agrarian reforms introduced by rulers of India in the 16th century.

== Background ==
Alauddin Khalji was the first ruler of the Delhi Sultanate to undertake large-scale fiscal and revenue reforms. His predecessors had largely relied on the pre-existing administrative set-up. Ziauddin Barani, who wrote around half-a-century after Alauddin's death, is the main source of information for Alauddin's reforms.

The countryside was largely under the domain of traditional Hindu authorities (khods, muqudaams, choudharies) who controlled the agricultural production. They served as the middlemen through whom the rural population was controlled. Alauddin saw them as rebellious and an impediment of smooth functioning of the government.

The land-holders exacted as much tax as possible from the peasants and gave only due share to the state. The surplus revenue made them rich and overbearing. The domineering behaviour of the Hindu chiefs always desiring for independence was also mentioned by Jalaluddin Firuz Khalji.

Barani mentions Alauddin's complaint against these Hindu middlemen in detail (translated by Dietmar Rothermund and Hermann Kulke):

I have discovered that the khuts and mukkadims [local tax collectors and village headmen] ride upon fine horses, wear fine clothes, shoot with Persian bows, make war upon each other, and go out for hunting; but of the kharaj [land revenue], jizya [poll tax], kari [house tax] and chari [pasture tax] they do not pay one jital. They levy separately the khut's [landowner's] share from the villages, give parties and drink wine, and many of them pay no revenue at all, either upon demand or without demand. Neither do they show any respect for my officers. This has excited my anger, and I have said to myself: 'Thou hast an ambition to conquer other lands, but thou hast hundreds of leagues of country under thy rule where proper obedience is not paid to thy authority. How then wilt thou make other lands submissive?'

— Barani

== Objective ==
After facing multiple rebellions by his nephews and officers in 1301, Alauddin implemented four measures to prevent rebellions. He aimed at preventing rebellions by weakening the nobility. He also viewed the haughtiness as well as direct and indirect resistance of the traditional Hindu village heads, who controlled the countryside and agricultural production, as the main impediment in his rule.

He sought to reduce the power of his Hindu population and according to Barani, he asked "the wise men to supply some rules and regulations for grinding down the Hindus, and for depriving them of that wealth and property which fosters disaffection and rebellion."

According to Barani, after his initial measures against the nobles, Alauddin asked his advisors for suggestions on how to subjugate the Hindus, whose wealth — like that of the nobles — could potentially lead to disloyalty and rebellions. His advisers suggested taking away revenue assignments from the landlords, one law for revenue from both landlords and tenants as well as ending collection charges so "the revenue due from the strong might not fall upon the weak".

Historian K. S. Lal says that the statement of Barani that Alauddin undertook a series of measures to "crush the Hindus" was a sentiment of an orthodox historian rather than a fact of the matter. He says that though Barani lends a communal colour to Jalaluddin's complaint against their behaviour, it was clear that the Hindu middle-class was well-off and not inclined to servility. Historian Banarsi Prasad Saksena believes that Barani used the word "Hindu" to refer to the upper-class Hindu chiefs: he did not include the Hindu peasants under this term. Historian Satish Chandra believes that Alauddin's measures were taken against the "privileged sections in the countryside" in general.

== The reforms ==
=== Confiscation of private lands ===
The Delhi Sultanate included the territory governed directly by the emperor's government, as well as the territories governed by his vassals. The crown territory governed by the emperor was called khalisa, and its revenues went directly to the royal treasury. The vassals (called rais, ranas and rawats) had the freedom to determine the tax rate for their subjects. Many of them were expected to maintain their own armies, and provide military support to the crown when required.

The Sultans of Delhi also made several land grants and assigned territories to their nobles as iqta's. The iqta' holders had the right to collect taxes in their territories: the money would be used to raise a local army that would support the Sultan when needed, and a part of money would be remitted to the Sultan.

As part of his land reforms, Alauddin brought a large tract of fertile land under the crown territory, by eliminating iqta's, grants and vassals in the Ganga-Yamuna Doab region extending from Meerut to Kara. After assassinating his predecessor Jalaluddin in 1296, he had made a large number of land grants to gain support of the nobles. However, after consolidating the power, in 1297, he deposed a large number of nobles who had earlier served Jalaluddin. He confiscated their property, and resumed their iqta's into the crown territory.

Sometime later, probably after Haji Maula's rebellion in 1301, Alauddin decided to confiscate more private wealth as part of his measures to weaken those capable of organizing a rebellion. He confiscated a large number of lands that had earlier been held as private property (milk), and re-designated them as part of the crown territory. He also annulled several land grants, including those awarded to religious or charitable organizations (waqf) and those exempt from service obligations (inam).

=== Direct revenue collection ===
Before Alauddin's reforms, the Delhi Sultanate did not collect the land revenues directly from the peasants. The peasants surrendered the land revenues to intermediary chiefs, known as khuts, muqaddams, and chaudharis, who represented villages or groups of villages. These chiefs surrendered a fixed part of the revenue to the Sultanate's Ministry of Revenue, irrespective of how much revenue they extracted from the peasants. Apparently, the Sultanate's government did not have adequate staff in the rural areas, and as long as the intermediary chiefs paid their pre-determined share of revenue, the government did not bother about how they treated the peasants.

Alauddin noticed that the intermediary chiefs fought against each other, flaunted their lavish lifestyle, and some of them did not remit revenues to the crown. He sought advice from Qazi Mughisuddin of Bayana on how to suppress these chiefs. Subsequently, his administration decided to collect the revenues directly from the cultivators. All cultivators, from the village chiefs to the peasants, had to remit half of their revenues to the crown. The village chiefs lost all their privileges.

Alauddin's government accepted the revenue in both cash and kind. In the fertile regions near Delhi, the government preferred taking revenue in kind: the grain collected as a result was taken to the state granaries. The peasants were not allowed to take the surplus grain to their homes, and were compelled to sell it in the market or to the transporters at a low price.

=== 50% tax proportional to land area ===
Before Alauddin's reforms, the land revenue for each territory represented by an intermediary was fixed irrespective of the cultivation area in that territory. The fixed amount was probably based on tradition. Alauddin's administration changed this convention, and determined the revenue amount based on the area under cultivation and the produce per biswa. This practice of determining the revenue amount based on the land area was known to the Hindu kings and was followed in southern India during Alauddin's time. However, it seems to have fallen into disuse in northern India, and Alauddin was the first Muslim emperor of India to implement it.

The amount demanded by the Hindu rulers ranged from one-sixth to one-third of the agricultural produce, depending on the situation of the kingdom. The Muslim Sultans of Delhi who preceded Alauddin do not seem to have demanded more than one-third of the produce in tax either. However, Alauddin imposed a 50% kharaj (Islamic tax on agricultural land) in a substantial part of northern India. The cultivators were required to pay half of the agricultural produce as a tax: this was the maximum amount allowed by the Hanafi school of Islam, which was dominant in Delhi at that time.

Alauddin's administration forced the village chiefs to pay the same taxes as the others and banned them from imposing illegal taxes on the peasants. The demand for tax proportional to the land area meant that the rich and powerful villages with more land had to pay more taxes. By suppressing the village chiefs, Alauddin projected himself as the protector of the weaker section of the rural society.

According to Barani, the 50% land tax greatly reduced the wealth of the Hindus who dominated agriculture. To prevent any rebellions, the imperial administration deprived the village chiefs of their wealth, horses and arms. Barani states that "it was impossible for the Hindu to raise his head": The fear of Alauddin made these chiefs so obedient, that a single foot soldier from the revenue office would "tie the necks" of twenty village chiefs together, and "kick and thrash them for the realization of the tribute". According to Barani, the financial condition of these Hindu village chiefs became so bad that their wives had to work for wages in houses of Muslims. Historian Kishori Saran Lal believes that while the Hindus suffered most from these reforms (as they dominated the agriculture), the others - including noblemen, traders, and cultivators - were also negatively impacted.

=== Other taxes ===
Apart from the kharaj, Alauddin's government levied a tax on residences (called ghari) and a tax on grazing (called chara'i). Unlike kharaj, these taxes were not sanctioned by the Islamic law. For the farmers with milk animals, Alauddin's administration fixed and assigned the pastures.

In addition, Alauddin's government imposed the jizya tax on its non-Muslim subjects. Women and children, as well as those with mental disorders and intellectual disability, were exempt from jizya. The Muslims were obligated to contribute zakat instead.

Alauddin demanded four-fifths share of the spoils of war from his soldiers, instead of the traditional one-fifth share (khums).

== Implementation ==
Alauddin's revenue reforms were not implemented throughout his empire. These reforms were limited to certain crown-governed territories, which included parts of the Indo-Gangetic plains from Punjab to Uttar Pradesh, Rajasthan, and Malwa. By the time of Alauddin's ascension, the imperial rule in the central region of the Sultanate (the upper Ganges valley and the eastern Rajasthan) had been consolidated, which allowed Alauddin to take up the reforms in these areas.

The responsibility for implementing these reforms was given to a minister with the title naib wazir. Two different recensions of Barani's Tarikh-i-Firuz Shahi name the minister differently as Malik Yaklakhi and Sharaf al-Din Qa'ini. The minister implemented the new laws uniformly across several crown-governed territories. These territories included Delhi; present-day Uttar Pradesh (including Rohilkhand and the Ganges-Yamuna Doab, but excluding Awadh and Bihar); the Punjab region (except Multan); parts of present-day Rajasthan; and Malwa. For the first time in India, the crown established a direct relationship with the cultivators on such a large scale.

=== Staff ===
A large number of officials were recruited for implementing the new laws: tribute demanders, revenue collectors, government agents, accountants, auditors, clerks, and office managers. The employees were expected to know Persian (the official court language) as well as the local language, which suggests that the staff must have included Hindus.

Initially, there was widespread corruption among the revenue employees, who misappropriated the state funds and extorted money from the taxpayers. To address this problem, Alauddin created a new department called Divan-i-Mustakhraj, which was responsible for investigating and realizing the arrears from the revenue collectors. Alauddin increased the salaries of the revenue employees, and instituted punishments for the erring employees. However, these measures did not reduce the corruption to satisfactory levels. Therefore, he resorted to more severe punishments for the corrupt revenue staff.

The revenue ministry regularly checked the registers of the village accountants, and strictly punished the corrupt officials. By Alauddin's own estimates, 10,000 corrupt revenue officials were punished in Delhi alone. Barani mentions that it was impossible for the revenue officials to take bribes from Hindus and Muslims, or to obtain money dishonestly in any other way. According to him, death was considered preferable to being a revenue official, and people would not marry their daughters to a revenue clerk. This seems to be an obvious exaggeration: the government service continued be considered prestigious during Alauddin's reign, and the government officials were sought after as marriage partners.

== Revocation and legacy ==
Some of Alauddin's land reforms were continued by his successors, and were a basis of the agrarian reforms introduced by the later rulers such as Sher Shah Suri and Akbar.

Other regulations of Alauddin were revoked by his son Qutbuddin Mubarak Shah a few months after his death. Mubarak Shah reinstated the lands incorporated by Alauddin into the crown territory to their private owners. He also released a large number of prisoners that Alauddin's administration had arrested for various reasons, including corruption.

Alauddin's practice of appropriating four-fifths of the spoils of war from the soldiers continued until the reign of Firuz Shah Tughluq, who switched back to the traditional demand of one-fifth share (khums).
