= Malika-i-Jahan (wife of Alauddin Khalji) =

Malika-è-Jahan
- Shahzadi of the Delhi Sultanate

Malika of the Delhi Sultanate
- Tenure: c. 1296–1316
- Spouse: Alauddin Khalji
- House: Khalji (by birth)
- Father: Jalal-ud-Din Khalji
- Mother: Malika-e-Jahan
- Religion: Sunni Islam

Malika-i-Jahan ("Queen of the World") was the first and chief wife of Sultan Alauddin Khalji, the most powerful ruler of the Khalji dynasty that ruled the Delhi Sultanate. She was the daughter of Alauddin's predecessor and paternal uncle, Sultan Jalaluddin Khalji, the founder of the Khalji dynasty.

== Family and lineage ==
Malika-i-Jahan was the daughter of Jalaluddin Khalji, the founder and first Sultan of the Khalji dynasty that ruled the Delhi Sultanate. Her mother, also titled Malika-i-Jahan, was Jalaluddin's chief wife. She was quite an ambitious lady and held great influence over the Sultan. She also influenced contemporary politics to great extent. Malika-i-Jahan had at least three brothers: Khan-i-Khan, Arkali Khan and Qadr Khan. Her future husband, Alauddin, was the eldest son of Jalaluddin's older brother, Shihabuddin Mas'ud, making Malika-i-Jahan a first-cousin of Alauddin. After his father's death, Alauddin was brought up by Jalaluddin. His younger brother, Almas Beg, also married a daughter of Jalaluddin.

== Marriage ==
Malika-i-Jahan married Alauddin long before the Khalji revolution of 1290. Alauddin rose to prominence after the marriage, for when Jalaluddin became the Sultan of Delhi in 1290, he was appointed as Amir-i-Tuzuk (equivalent to Master of ceremonies), while Almas Beg was given the post of Akhur-beg (equivalent to Master of the Horse). The marriage was not a happy one; Malika-i-Jahan took pride in being the daughter of the Sultan, and was neglected by Alauddin due to her haughty demeanour. He fell out with the princess when she attempted to dominate him and exhibited open jealousy and contempt towards his second wife, Mahru, the sister of Alp Khan. Once, while Alauddin and Mahru were together in a garden, Malika-i-Jahan attacked Mahru. In a fit of temper, Alauddin assaulted her. The incident was reported to Jalaluddin, but the Sultan did not take any action against Alauddin.

Alauddin was also on bad terms with his mother-in-law, who convinced Jalaluddin that he was aiming to carve out an independent kingdom in a remote part of the country. Fearful of his mother-in-law's influence on the Sultan, Alauddin brought no complaint against his wife. In 1296, Alauddin murdered Jalaluddin and took over the throne, proclaiming himself the new sultan of the Delhi Sultanate. Malika-i-Jahan never forgave her husband for the murder of her father.

== In popular culture ==
Malika-i-Jahan was portrayed by Aditi Rao Hydari in Sanjay Leela Bhansali's period film Padmaavat (2018), where she is known as Mehrunissa.

== Bibliography ==
- Banarsi Prasad Saksena (1992) [1970]. "The Khaljis: Alauddin Khalji". In Mohammad Habib; Khaliq Ahmad Nizami (eds.). A Comprehensive History of India: The Delhi Sultanat (A.D. 1206-1526). Vol. 5 (Second ed.). The Indian History Congress / People's Publishing House. OCLC 31870180.
- Kishori Saran Lal (1950). History of the Khaljis (1290–1320). Allahabad: The Indian Press. OCLC 685167335.
