= Sankarna =

- Village
- Location in Rajasthan, India Sankarna (India)
- Coordinates: 25°21′35″N 72°41′40″E
- Country: India
- State: Rajasthan
- District: Jalore
- Tehsil: Ahore

Area
  - Total: 2,359 ha (5,830 acres)

Population (2011)
  - Total: 3,461

Sankarna (सांकरणा ) is a village in Jalor district of Rajasthan. It is located in the south of Rajasthan, 10 km from district headquarters.

Sankarna is a popular village in Ahore tehsil. It is predominated by four sub-castes of Rajpurohit community: Raigur, Fondar, Daival, Udesh, among others. The village is internally divided into two; chota vaas (small enclave) and bada vaas (large enclave). The division is solely geographical. They are further divided into several lineages that ghetto in specific parts of the village, concentrating around a landmark meeting point (pols). But these divisions are insignificant in reference to social practices like marriage, funeral, among other activities.

It comes under the Ahore constituency for the legislative assembly and Jalore-Sirohi for the parliamentary seat. The dominant profession is trading. Agriculture used to be the common profession which is thinning out lately. Public services is a new avenue its people are pursuing. Sankarna's football team comes first at the district level every time. Gair-dance is famous here, which is done by all people at night.

== History ==
Sankarna is identified with Sakarne, where the army of the Delhi Sultanate ruler Alauddin Khalji, led by his generals Ulugh Khan and Nusrat Khan, halted after its raid on Gujarat in 1299. The Mongol soldiers of Alauddin's army mutined overpayment of khums during the halt. At that time, Sankarna was a part of the Jalore kingdom. According to the 17th-century chronicler Munhot Nainsi's Nainsi ri Khyat, the rebels were aided by the local ruler Kanhadadeva, but the veracity of this claim is doubtful, as Nainsi incorrectly mentions that Alauddin was personally present at the location of the mutiny.

In 1311, the Jalore kingdom was captured by Alauddin Khalji. It subsequently became part of several kingdoms and empires. Before the independence of India in 1947, it came under the jurisdiction of Jodhpur State.
