= Yahya bin Ahmad Sirhindi =

15th-century Indian chronicler

- Born: Sirhind, Delhi Sultanate
- Occupation: Historian

Academic work
- Era: 15th century
- Sub-discipline: History of the Delhi Sultanate
- Notable works: Tarikh-i-Mubarak Shahi

Yahya bin Ahmad Sirhindi (nisba of Sirhind in Punjab) was a 15th-century Muslim historian who wrote Tarikh-i-Mubarak Shahi, a Persian language chronicle of the Delhi Sultanate. Written during the reign of Mubarak Shah, his work is an important source of information for the Sayyid dynasty.

== Tarikh-i-Mubarak Shahi ==
Yahya expected to become a courtier of Mubarak Shah (r. 1421–1434), a ruler of the Delhi Sultanate. Therefore, he wrote Tarikh-i-Mubarak Shahi and presented it to the Sultan, hoping to win the royal patronage.

The book begins with the conquests of Muhammad of Ghor (1149–1206) and ends abruptly in 1434. Several earlier royal chroniclers had written texts describing the 13th- to 15th-century history of the Delhi Sultanate. For example, Minhaj-i-Siraj covered the period up to 1259 in his Tabaqat-i Nasiri, Ziauddin Barani covered 1259–1356, and Shams-i Siraj Afif covered 1356–1388 in his Tarikh-i Feroz Shahi. Yahya carried forward this chronology to 1434.

For the events up to 1351, Yahya selectively borrowed from the earlier writers and arranged the material in chronological order. For the events after 1351, he relied on personal memory and observations, besides the accounts of some trustworthy narrators. His work is a regional history, generally limited to military and political events. For example, Yahya omitted the economic reforms of Alauddin Khalji (r. 1296–1316).
