= Gurdan Saini =

Rajput military general (died 1291)

- Died: March 1291; Jhain, Kingdom of Ranthambore
- Occupation: Military general

Gurdan Saini (died March 1291), also known as Gurdas Saini, was a military general who died in the battle of Jhain between the forces of Jalal ud din Firuz Khalji and the Chahamana forces of Hammiradeva in the 13th century CE.

== Career ==
According to Kishori Lal, "Saini was a great general and had led several expeditions into the country of Malwa and Gujarat." He was killed in battle. The historians Henry Miers Elliot and John Dowson cite Miftah al-Futuh, a work by Amir Khusro, who describes Gurdan Saini in the Rajput army of Rana Hammira:

The Rai was in affright, and sent for Gurdan Saini, who was the most experienced warrior amongst the 40,000 Rawats under the Rai, and had seen many fights among the Hindus. "Sometimes he had gone with the advance to Malwa; sometimes he had gone plundering in Gujarat." The Saini took 10,000 Rawats with him from Jhain, and advanced against the Turks, and, after a severe action, he was slain. Upon which the Hindus fled, and in the pursuit many were slain and many taken prisoners...
