= Alauddin Khalji's raid on Devagiri =

1296 battle of the Delhi Sultanate

- Part of Delhi Sultanate's invasion of Seunda dynasty
Date	1296
Location	Devagiri
Result	Delhi Sultanate victory

Participants
Delhi Sultanate	Seuna (Yadava) dynasty

Commanders and leaders
Alauddin Khalji; Nusrat Khan	Simhana

Known places lying along Alauddin's route from Kara to Devagiri

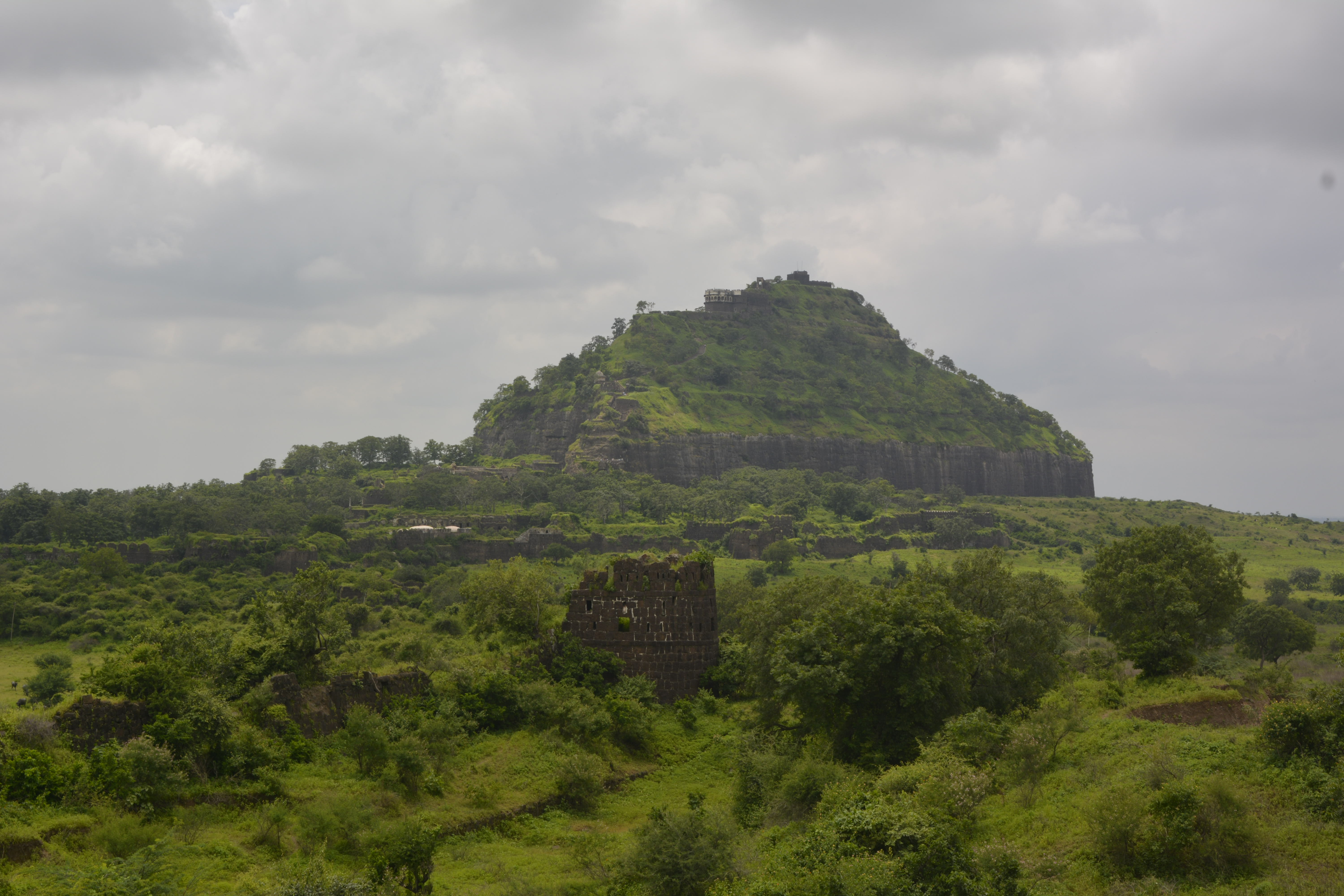
The Devagiri hill

In 1296, Alauddin Khalji (then known as Ali Gurshasp) raided Devagiri, the capital of the Yadava kingdom in the Deccan region of India. At the time, Alauddin was the governor of Kara in Delhi Sultanate, which was ruled by Jalaluddin Khalji. Alauddin kept his march to Devagiri a secret from Jalaluddin, because he intended to use the wealth obtained from this raid for dethroning the Sultan.

When Alauddin reached Devagiri, the Yadava king Ramachandra retreated to the hill fort, and Alauddin's army thoroughly ransacked the lower city. The defenders were under-prepared for a siege, as the Yadava army was away on an expedition under Ramachandra's son Simhana and the fort of Devagiri had insufficient provisions. Therefore, Ramachandra agreed to a peace treaty, offering Alauddin a large sum of money. However, Simhana soon arrived in the capital and engaged Alauddin in a battle. Alauddin emerged victorious, and forced the Yadavas to agree to a peace treaty. This time, the Yadavas were forced to pay a much larger war indemnity, and had to offer the revenues of the Achalpur province to Alauddin as tribute.

Alauddin returned to Kara after spending some days in Devagiri. He subsequently dethroned Jalaluddin, and sent a second expedition to Devagiri in 1308, which forced Ramachandra to become his vassal.

== Background ==
Alauddin Khalji was a nephew and a son-in-law of Jalaluddin Khalji, the ruler of the Delhi Sultanate. At that time, he was the governor of a province within the Sultanate and lived in the provincial capital Kara. The Yadava kingdom was located to the south of the Sultanate, in the Deccan region. The Paramara and the Chandela kingdoms, which separated the Delhi Sultanate and the Yadava kingdom, had declined in power. Alauddin wanted to usurp the power from Jalaluddin and had decided to plunder other kingdoms to raise money towards this objective. During his 1293 raid on Bhilsa, he had come to know about the immense wealth of the Yadava capital of Devagiri.

Over the next few years, he made preparations to attack Devagiri. He intended to complete the raid secretly and in a very short time, to avoid suspicion of Sultan Jalaluddin and to prevent any countermeasures by the Hindu kingdoms of Deccan. Therefore, he spread the false news that he was marching to Chanderi. He handed over the administration of Kara to Ala-ul-Mulk (the uncle of Ziauddin Barani), who sent fabricated news about Alauddin's movements to Jalaluddin.

== March to Devagiri ==
On 26 February 1296, Alauddin left Kara with an 8000-strong cavalry. He marched to Chanderi, and then secretly moved to Bhilsa. Next, he crossed the Vindhya Range, and reached Achalpur. Until this point, Alauddin had moved quickly to prevent any attacks from the local rulers of central India. However, at Achalpur, he allowed his troops to rest for two days to prepare for the raid. To avoid any attacks, he spread the news that he was a discontented nobleman who had come to seek asylum after rebelling against Jalaluddin.

From Achalpur, Alauddin marched to Devagiri via a pass known as Ghati Lajaura (or Lasaura). At this pass, Alauddin faced resistance from Kanhan, a feudatory of the Yadava king Ramachandra. According to the 14th-century historian Isami, Kanhan's army included two women commanders who fought like "tigresses", and forced Alauddin to fall back. However, Alauddin's second charge was successful and resulted in a complete rout of Kanhan's forces.

== At Devagiri ==
Devagiri was a fortified city, but it was largely unprotected when Alauddin reached there. The fortifications had weakened because of complacency of the Yadavas, who had not faced any recent attacks on their capital. The major portion of the Yadava army was away on an expedition led by the crown prince Simhana. In addition, the fort was short on provisions. The old Yadava king Ramachandra retreated to the fort, which was located on the top of a hill. Alauddin's army plundered houses and businesses in the lower part of the city, which had been left undefended. The invaders imprisoned the prominent merchants of the city. They also captured 30-40 elephants and around 1,000 horses from the royal stables.

Meanwhile, Alauddin spread a rumour that his force was only the vanguard of a 20,000-strong cavalry, which would shortly reach Devagiri. Under these circumstances, Ramchandra realized that he would not be able to withstand a siege. Therefore, he sent messengers to Alauddin, warning him that Simhana would arrive with the Yadava army anytime, and it would be in Alauddin's best interests to agree to a peace treaty. Alauddin wanted to return to Kara quickly, in order to keep his march a secret. Therefore, he accepted Ramachandra's offer of a monetary payment, and in exchange, promised to release all prisoners and leave the city within a fortnight.

However, before the treaty could be realized, Simhana returned to Devagiri. When he arrived near Devagiri, Ramachandra sent him a message advising him to honour the peace treaty, as the invading army was very powerful. However, Simhana ignored his father's advice, and sent a message to Alauddin, asking the invader to return all the loot and retreat. According to the 16th-century historian Firishta, this message angered Alauddin so much that he blackened the faces of Simhana's messengers, and paraded them in his camp.

Alauddin left a 1000-strong cavalry under Nusrat Khan in the city and led the rest of his men to fight against Simhana. The Yadava army, which outnumbered Alauddin's force, overcame the invaders in the initial part of the battle. When Nusrat Khan received this news, he left the city without waiting for Alauddin's order and led his army to the battlefield. The Yadavas mistook his contingent for the rumored 20,000-strong cavalry and fled from the battlefield in panic.

Alauddin then returned to the fort and laid a siege. He ordered several Brahmin and merchant prisoners to be killed, and paraded close relatives and nobles of Ramachandra in front of the fort. At first, Ramachandra considered seeking assistance from the neighbouring Hindu kings. However, it was soon discovered that the fort did not have sufficient food provisions: the Yadavas had bought inside the fort around 2,000-3,000 bags left by panicked merchants when Alauddin's army first reached the city. They had assumed that these bags contained grain, but it was discovered that they contained only salt.

A dejected Ramachandra then pleaded with Alauddin for a peace treaty. Alauddin, who wanted to return to Kara quickly, agreed to a truce. This time, he demanded a much larger sum as war indemnity. According to the 14th-century chronicler Ziauddin Barani, the wealth obtained by Alauddin during this raid was so much that even after being squandered by Alauddin's successors, a large part of it remained till the reign of Firuz Shah Tughlaq in the 1350s. According to the 16th-century historian Firishta, the wealth obtained by Alauddin included:

- 600 mann of gold
- 1,000 mann of silver
- 7 mann of pearls
- 2 mann of precious stones including rubies, sapphires, diamonds, and emeralds
- 4,000 pieces of silk and other items

In addition, Ramachandra agreed to send the revenues from the Achalpur province to Alauddin. As part of the treaty, Alauddin released the surviving prisoners. He left Devagiri five days after he had entered the city.

== Aftermath ==
Alauddin's raid was the first successful Muslim invasion of Deccan. Instead of surrendering the loot from Devagiri to Sultan Jalaluddin, Alauddin took it to his residence in Kara. Later, he invited Jalaluddin to Kara and killed him there. He then proclaimed himself as the new Sultan. In the 1300s, when Ramachandra stopped sending yearly tributes to Delhi, Alauddin sent a large army to subdue him. This second expedition to Devagiri resulted in Ramachandra becoming a vassal to Alauddin.

Alauddin married Ramachandra's daughter Jhatyapali, who became the mother of his son and successor Shihabuddin Omar and Qutbuddin Mubarak Shah. Historian Kishori Saran Lal believes that Ramachandra gave his daughter to Alauddin after the 1296 raid, but historian Satish Chandra states that this probably happened after the second expedition.
