= Ruknuddin Ibrahim =

Sultan of Delhi in 1296

- Sultan

Acting Sultan of Delhi
- Reign: 19 July 1296 – November 1296
- Coronation: 21 October 1296
- Predecessor: Jalal-ud-Din Khalji
- Successor: Alauddin Khalji
- Regent: Malika-i-Jahan
- Died: c. 1297; Hansi, Delhi Sultanate
Regnal name
- Al-Sultan al-Azam Rukn ud-Dunya Wa'l-Din Abu'l Muzaffar Ibrahim Shah al-Sultan bin al-Sultan al-Azam Jalal ud-Dunya Wa'l-Din Firuz Shah Nasir Amir al-Muminin (Note: السلطان الاعظم رکن الدنیا والالدین ابوالمظفر ابراہیم شاہ السلطان بن السلطان الاعظم جلال الدین والدین فیروز شاہ ناصر امیر المومنین)
- House: Khalji Dynasty
- Father: Jalal-ud-Din Khalji
- Mother: Malika-i-Jahan
- Religion: Sunni Islam

Rukn-ud-Din Ibrahim Shah (died c. 1297; born Qadr Khan), commonly known as Ruknuddin Ibrahim, was the acting Sultan of the Khalji dynasty throughout the latter half of 1296.

== Background ==
Rukn ud-din Ibrahim Qadr Khan was born to Jalal-ud-Din Khalji (1220–1296), a member of the Khalaj tribe and founder of the Khalji dynasty of Delhi, and his wife, Malika-i-Jahan.

== Sultan of Delhi ==
Upon the death of his father, his mother decided that it would be risky to allow the throne to be vacant while the intended successor was absent, hence ascending the young Ruknuddin to the throne, instead of Jalal-ud-Din's elder son—Arkali Khan—who was then the governor of Multan. Nonetheless, Ruknuddin wouldn't harbor any power amid his brief reign, with his mother instead acting as a regent. His coronation took place on October 21, 1296.

The reception of his ascension was poor, and many believed that Alauddin Khalji was a more fit ruler. As tensions grew, Ruknuddin and his mother fled the city in the "dead of night," leaving Alauddin to rule.

== Captivity and death ==
Ruknuddin died around 1297, sometime subsequent to the fall of Multan, while in captivity in Hansi.
