= Chhan, Sawai Madhopur =

Chhan Jhain, Jhayin
- village
- Location within India Location within Rajasthan
- Coordinates: 25.89077°N 76.48234°E
- Country: India
- State: Rajasthan
- District: Sawai Madhopur
- Tehsil: Khandar

Area
  - Total: 2.5963 km^{2} (1.0024 sq mi)
- Elevation: 223 m (732 ft)

Population (2011)
  - Total: 1,015
  - Density: 390.9/km^{2} (1,013/sq mi)
- Time zone: UTC+5:30 (IST)
- Postal Index Number: 322001
- STD code: 01435

Chhan is a village in the Sawai Madhopur district of Rajasthan, India. It is identified with Jhain (or Jhayin), which is mentioned in the Delhi Sultanate chronicles as an important town of 13th and 14th century India.

== History ==
Chhan is identified with the Jhain town mentioned in the Delhi Sultanate chronicles. In the late 13th century, Jhain was a part of the Chahamana kingdom, and guarded the approaches to the kingdom's capital Ranthambore.

According to the Delhi Sultanate chronicles, Jhain was renamed to Shahr-i Nau ("new town") in 1301. Therefore, historian Kishori Saran Lal (1950) speculated that Jhain may be the modern Naya Gaon (or Naigaon) village located near Ranthambore. However, Satya Prakash Gupta (1975) identified Jhain with Chhan (or Chhain), located between Naya Gaon and Ranthambore, around 16 km from Naya Gaon. Gupta notes that according to the Mughal courtier Abul Fazl, the pass of Jhain led to Ranthambhore. This description fits Chhan, where the road to Ranthambore ascends the hills. The Sultanate records also show that Jhain was located very close to Ranthambore: Jhain is located around 11 km south-east of Ranthambore.

=== Khalji period ===
According to Miftah al-Futuh of the Delhi courtier Amir Khusrau, the Delhi Sultan Jalaluddin Khalji invaded Jhain in 1291. When Jalaluddin came close to the Jhain fort, a Chahamana army led by Gardan Saini came out of the fort and fought the invaders. After the battle ended with a Delhi victory and Saini's death, the remaining Chahamana contingents stationed at Jhain evacuated the fort, and retreated to Ranthambore. The invaders subsequently plundered Jhain, and dismantled the fort. Jalaluddin admired the non-Islamic sculpture and carvings of Jhain, but being an iconoclast, he broke the idols. The Miftah al-Futuh claims that this battle resulted in deaths of thousands of defenders, but only one Turkic soldier of Delhi was killed.

According to Ziauddin Barani's Tarikh-i-Firuz Shahi, Jalaluddin planned to conquer Ranthambore, but retreated to avoid loss of Muslim lives. In 1292, the Delhi army invaded Jhain again, obtaining plunder in the process.

During Alauddin Khalji's conquest of Ranthambore in 1301, the Delhi army captured Jhain and renamed it to Shahr-i Nau ("new town"). Alauddin's brother and general Ulugh Khan was granted Ranthambore and Jhain as iqta'. By the time of Ulugh Khan's successor Malik Izz al-Din Bura Khan, Jhain was subjected to the same land-tax (kharaj) as the core territories of the Sultanate, indicating that it was now firmly under the control of the Delhi Sultanate.

=== Mughal period ===
In the Mughal Empire, Jhain was a pargana in the Garh Ranthamnbore sarkar of the Ajmer subah. The pargana was held by Jai Singh II and his ancestors as jagir (fief).

== Demographics ==
According to the 2011 Census of India, Chhan has 196 households with 1,015 people. The population includes 561 males and 454 females. Of all the villagers, 208 belong to Scheduled Castes, and 502 belong to Scheduled Tribes. 393 of the villagers are illiterate.
