= Alauddin Khalji's raid on Bhilsa =

1293 raid on Bhilsa (now Vidisha), India

- Part of Sieges involving Delhi Sultanate
Date	1293
Location	Bhilsa
Result	Delhi Sultanate victory

Belligerents
Delhi Sultanate	Paramara

Commanders and leaders
Alauddin Khalji	Mahalakadeva

Kara and Bhilsa in present-day India

As a general of Jalal-ud-din Khalji, his nephew and son-in-law Alauddin Khalji (then known as Ali Gurshasp) raided the Paramara city of Bhilsa in 1293 CE. He damaged the city's Hindu temples, and looted a large amount of wealth.

== Background ==
Alauddin Khalji was the governor of Kara in Sultan Jalaluddin's Delhi Sultanate. Although he feigned allegiance to the Sultan, he was determined to dethrone Jalaluddin, and sought to raise money for a successful coup. Towards this objective, he decided to target Bhilsa, a wealthy city in the Paramara kingdom of Malwa. By the 1290s, the Paramaras had been weakened by Chahamana, Vaghela, and Yadava invasions. In late 1292 CE, Alauddin Khalji obtained the Sultan's permission to raid Bhilsa.

== The raid ==
In 1293 CE, Alauddin marched towards Bhilsa via the Chanderi-Ujjain road. His sudden attack took the city's residents by surprise.

The town had several richly-endowed Hindu temples, from which Alauddin obtained a large amount of wealth, including precious metals and cattle. The residents of Bhilsa concealed their idols in the riverbed of Betwa to prevent Alauddin's army from desecrating them. But Alauddin had these idols hauled out of Betwa. He damaged a number of temples, and plundered a large amount of wealth. According to Badauni's Muntakhab-ut-Tawarikh, Alauddin also brought to Delhi a large Hindu idol, which was placed at the Badaun Gate to be trampled by the people.

== Aftermath ==
At Bhilsa, Alauddin learned of the immense wealth of the southern Seuna (Yadava) kingdom, and about the routes leading to their capital Devagiri. Therefore, he shrewdly surrendered the loot from Bhilsa to Jalaluddin to gain the Sultan's confidence, while withholding the information on the Yadava kingdom.

A pleased Jalaluddin rewarded Alauddin with the office of Ariz-i Mamalik (Ministry of War), which his father once held. Jalaluddin also made him the governor of Awadh, and granted his request to use the revenue surplus for hiring additional troops. Subsequently, in 1296, Alauddin raided Devagiri, and used the loot accumulated from there to raise an army and usurp the power from Jalaluddin.
