= Jalal-ud-Din Khalji =

Sultan of Delhi from 1290 to 1296

Jalal-ud-Din Khalji جلال الدین خلجی
- Sultan
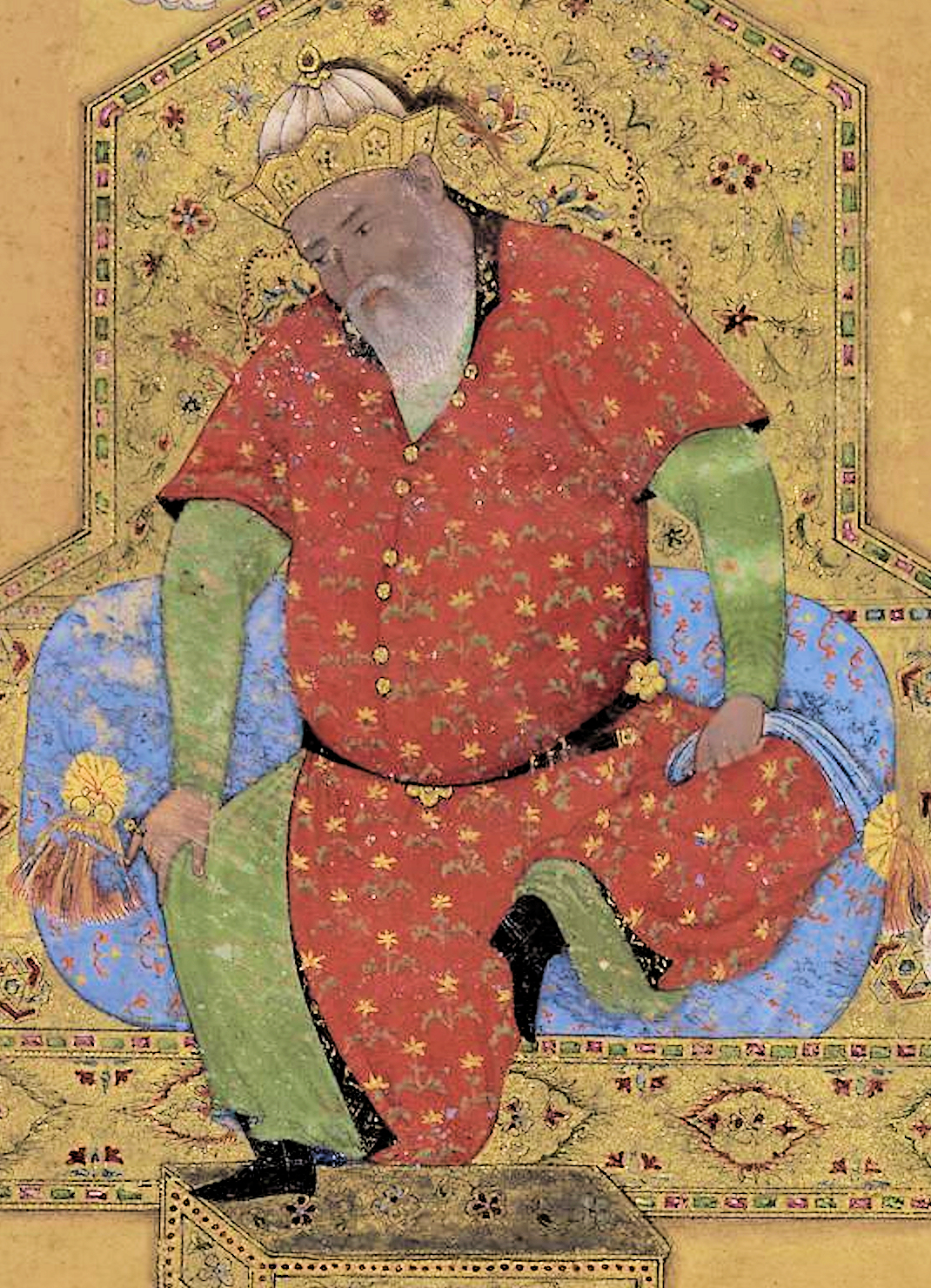
- Imaginary portrait of Jalaluddin Khalji (enthroned, c. 1640)

12th Sultan of Delhi Khalji Emperor
- Reign: 13 June 1290 – 19 July 1296
- Coronation: 13 June 1290
- Predecessor: Shamsuddin Kayumars
- Successor: Alauddin Khalji; Ruknuddin Ibrahim (acting)
- Born: c. 1220; Paktia, Afghanistan
- Died: 19 July 1296 (aged 75–76); Kara, India
- Spouse: Malika-i-Jahan
- Issue: Khan-i-Khan Mahmud; Arkali Khan; Ruknuddin Ibrahim Qadr Khan; Malika-i-Jahan (wife of Alauddin Khalji)
Regnal name
- Al-Sultan al-Azam Jalal ud-Dunya Wa'l-Din Abu'l Muzaffar Firuz Shah al-Sultan (Note: السلطان الاعظم جلال الدنیا والالدین ابو المظفر فیروز شاہ السلطان)
- House: Khalji
- Religion: Sunni Islam

Jalal-ud-Din Khalji, also known as Firuz al-Din Khalji, Jalaluddin Khilji or Firuz II (Persian: جلال الدین خلجی; c. 1220 – 19 July 1296) was the Sultan of Delhi from 1290 until his death in 1296. He was the founder and first Sultan of the Khalji dynasty that ruled the Delhi Sultanate of India from 1290 to 1320.

Originally named Firuz, Jalal-ud-Din started his career as an officer of the Mamluk dynasty, and rose to an important position under Sultan Muizzuddin Qaiqabad. After Qaiqabad was paralyzed, a group of nobles appointed his infant son Shamsuddin Kayumars as the new Sultan, and subsequently tried to kill Jalal-ud-Din. Instead, Jalal-ud-Din had the group of nobles killed and became regent. A few months later, he deposed Kayumars, and became the new Sultan.

As a Sultan, he repulsed a Mongol invasion, and allowed many Mongols to settle in India after their conversion to Islam. He captured Mandawar and Jhain from the Chahamana king Hammira, although he was unable to capture the Chahamana capital Ranthambore. During his reign, his nephew Ali Gurshasp raided Bhilsa in 1293 and Devagiri in 1296.

Jalal-ud-Din, who was around 70 years old at the time of his ascension, was known as a mild-mannered, humble and kind monarch to the general public. During the first year of his reign, he ruled from Kilokhri to avoid confrontations with the old Turkic nobles of the imperial capital Delhi. Several nobles considered him as a weak ruler, and unsuccessfully attempted to overthrow him at different times. He meted out lenient punishments to the rebels, except in case of a dervish Sidi Maula, who was executed for allegedly conspiring to dethrone him. Jalal-ud-Din was ultimately assassinated by his nephew Ali Gurshasp, who subsequently ascended the throne as Alauddin Khalji.

== Early life ==
Jalal-ud-din was a member of the Khalaj tribe, a tribe of originally Afghan origin the Ghilji tribe.

The contemporary chronicles of the Delhi Sultanate do not provide much information about Jalaluddin's background. According to the 15th-century text Tarikh-i-Mubarak Shahi, Jalaluddin was a son of "Bughrush", which seems to be a mistake for Yughrush. According to Tabaqat-i Nasiri (1260), the son of Amir Yughrush - probably Jalaluddin - visited Delhi with a Mongol embassy in 1260. According to the Ilkhanate chronicler Wassaf, Jalaluddin served the Mongols as the commander (shahna) of Binban, located just west of the Indus River. According to Amir Khusrau's Miftah al-Futuh, Jalaluddin fought against the refractory Mongol and Afghan tribes in the Salt Range: it is possible that this refers to his exploits in the Mongol service.

Jalaluddin probably entered the Delhi Sultanate service sometime during the reign of Balban. According to Isami, he was in the service of Balban's son Bughra Khan. This likely happened sometime before 1280, during Bughra Khan's tenure as the governor of Samana. Jalaluddin gradually rose to prominence as a commander in north-western India, with Samana as his headquarters.

Before his ascension to the throne, Jalal-ud-din was known as Malik Firuz. He and his brother Shihabuddin (father of Alauddin Khalji) served Balban for several years. He rose to the position of sar-i-jandar (chief of the royal bodyguards), and was later appointed as the governor of the frontier province of Samana. As the governor, he distinguished himself in the Sultanate's conflicts with the Mongol invaders.

After Balban's death in 1287, Delhi's kotwal Malik al-Umara Fakhruddin enthroned Balban's teenage grandson Muiz ud din Qaiqabad (or Kayqubad) with the title Muizzuddin. Qaiqabad was a weak ruler, and the administration was actually run by his officer Malik Nizamuddin. After Nizamuddin was poisoned by some rival officers, Qaiqabad summoned Jalal-ud-din from Samana to Delhi, gave him the title "Shaista Khan", appointed him as the ariz-i-mumalik, and made him the governor of Baran.

By this time, Qaiqabad's health had deteriorated, and two rival factions of nobles vied for the power in Delhi. One faction, led by Malik Aytemur Surkha, sought to maintain the power of the old Turkic nobility, and wanted to retain Balban's family on the throne. The other faction, led by Jalal-ud-din, supported the rise of the new nobility.

== As a regent of Kayumars ==
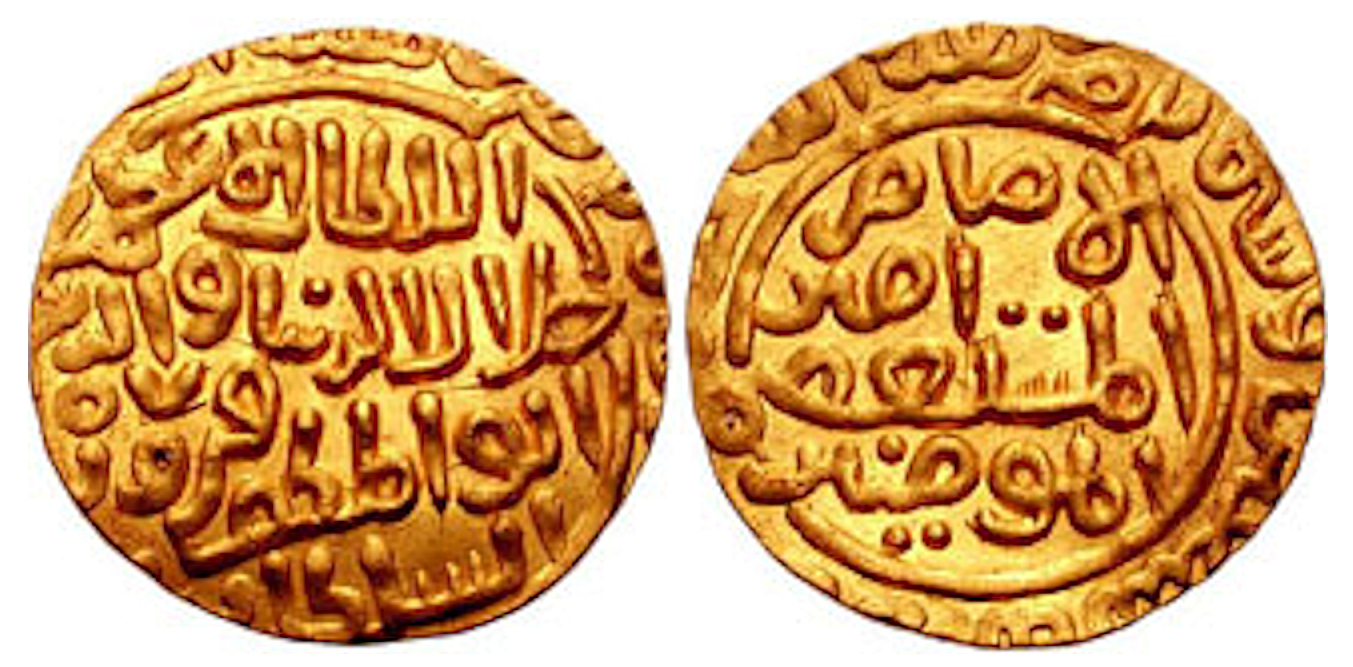
Coinage of Jalal al Din Firuz. Delhi mint. Dated AH 691 (1291-2 AD). Legend citing the caliph Al-Musta'sim.

When Qaiqabad was incurably paralyzed, Malik Surkha and his associate Malik Kachhan appointed his infant son Kayumars (or Kayumarth) on the throne with the title Shamsuddin II. The two nobles then conspired to kill their rival nobles, including Jalal-ud-din (then Malik Firuz). At this time, Jalal-ud-din was conducting an inspection of the royal army at Bhugal Pahari (Baharpur according to Ziauddin Barani). His nephew Malik Ahmad Chap, who held the office of naib-i amir-i hajib, informed him about the conspiracy. Jalal-ud-din then moved his quarters to Ghiyaspur, and summoned his relatives from Baran on the pretext of preparing for an impending Mongol invasion. Other officers on Surkha's hit list also joined the Khaljis.

Shortly after, Jalal-ud-din received an order summoning him to the royal court in Delhi, and realized that this was part of a plot to kill him. He excused himself on the pretext of conducting an inspection of the army at Kannauj. Kachhan then personally marched from Delhi to Kannauj, and told Jalal-ud-din that his presence was sought in Delhi immediately. Jalal-ud-din pretended not knowing anything about the conspiracy, and requested Kachhan to rest in a tent, while he finished the inspection. In the tent, Jalal-ud-din had Kachhan beheaded, and had his body thrown into the Yamuna River, starting a war between the two rival factions.

Jalal-ud-din's sons marched to Delhi, entered the royal palace, and brought the titular Sultan Kayumars to Jalal-ud-din's camp. Malik Surkha and his associates tried to retrieve Kayumars, but were captured and killed. Jalal-ud-din's men also abducted some sons of Malik al-Umara Fakhruddin, the kotwal of Delhi, and therefore, Fakhruddin dissuaded the people of Delhi from trying to retrieve Kayumars.

After eliminating the officers of the rival faction, Jalal-ud-din continued to acknowledge Kayumars as the Sultan of Delhi. He became the governor of Bhatinda, Dipalpur and Multan provinces. Initially, he offered Kayumars' regency to Balban's nephew Malik Chajju and Fakhruddin. However, Malik Chajju preferred to be the governor of Kara-Manikpur, and Fakhruddin also rejected the offer. Therefore, Jalal-ud-din himself became the regent.

Qaiqabad died on 1 February 1290: according to Yahya Sirhindi he died of starvation after being neglected, but another account states that he was murdered on Jalal-ud-din's orders by an officer whose father had been executed by him. Kayumars' titular reign (1290) lasted for around 3 months, before he was deposed by Jalal-ud-din.

== Ascension to the throne ==
Extent of the Delhi Sultanate at the time of Jalal-ud-din Khalji's ascension (1290)

Jalal-ud-din (known as Malik Firuz until this point), ascended the throne of Delhi in June 1290, at the unfinished Kilokhri (also Kilughari or Kailugarhi) Palace near Delhi. At the time of his ascension, Jalal-ud-din was very unpopular. He had little support among the old Turkic nobles, who viewed him as an Afghan (Pashtun), believing him to be of non-Turkic ancestry. In addition, he was an old man of around 70 years, and his mild nature was seen as unsuitable for the position. Because of his unpopularity, he decided not to move to Balban's palace at Delhi, and lived at Kilokhri, an Afghan enclave which served as the de facto capital. He finished the palace, and turned Kilokhri into an important town.

Jalal-ud-din avoided making any radical changes to the administrative set-up, and retained the old Turkic nobles in the offices that they held during Balban's reign. For example, Fakhruddin was retained as the kotwal of Delhi, Khwaja Khatir was retained as the wazir, and Balban's nephew Malik Chajju was retained as the governor of Kara-Manikpur. The surviving members of Balban's royal family moved to Kara under Chajju's governorship.

At the same time, Jalal-ud-din appointed his relatives and associates to the important offices. He appointed his brother Yaghrash Khan as the head of the army ministry (ariz-i-mamalik), and his nephew Ahmad Chap as naib-i barbek. He gave his eldest son Mahmud the title Khan-i-Khan; the next two sons were given the titles Arkali Khan and Qadr Khan. He also appointed his nephews Ali Gurshasp (later Sultan Alauddin) and Almas Beg as Amir-i-Tuzuk (equivalent to Master of ceremonies) and Akhur-beg (equivalent to Master of the Horse) respectively.

Gradually, Jalal-ud-din overcame the initial hostility that he had faced from the citizens of Delhi. He gained reputation as a humble and kind-hearted monarch, as opposed to the preceding despots like Balban. After entering Delhi, he had the royal entrance to the Red Palace dismounted, and refused to sit on the king's seat in the royal audience-hall, saying that the crown had been forced upon him because of the malicious intents of Surkha and Kachhan.

== Malik Chajju's revolt ==
While the general public admired Jalal-ud-din as a kind-hearted and sincere person, a section of nobles despised him as a weak ruler. In August 1290, Balban's nephew Malik Chajju Kashli Khan, who now headed the former royal family, staged a revolt against Jalal-ud-din at Kara. Chajju seems to have opted for the governorship of the easternmost province of Kara-Manikpur to remain away from imperial control, and possibly, because he hoped to seek support from his cousin Bughra Khan (father of Qaiqabad), who had become an independent ruler of the eastern Bengal region in 1287.

Chajju styled himself as Sultan Mughisuddin, and declared his independence. As a mark of his sovereignty, he issued his own coins, and had the khutba read in his name. Ali Hatim Khan, the governor of Awadh, as well as other older nobles appointed in the eastern region, supported him. Chajju was also supported by a number of Hindu chiefs of the Gangetic plains, who had not paid their tribute for some years, and who swore allegiance to Balban's family. Under these circumstances, Jalal-ud-din's loyal officers in the Ganga-Yamuna Doab region started withdrawing from the region.

Chajju was confident that he enjoyed more support than Jalal-ud-din, who was yet to find favour among the old nobles of Delhi and its neighbouring areas. Therefore, he marched towards Delhi along the left bank of the Ganges River, and then the Ramganga River. He probably planned to enter Delhi from Amroha area. At Badaun, his supporters Malik Bahadur and Alp Ghazi joined him with their troops.

Jalal-ud-din set out to crush the revolt after appointing his eldest son, who held the title Khan-i Khanan, in-charge of Delhi. He led his army towards Badaun via Koil (modern Aligarh). The vanguard of his army, led by his second eldest son Arkali Khan, marched ahead of the rest of the army, and spotted Chajju's army on the other side of the Ramganga River. Chajju's soldiers had seized all the boats, so Arkali Khan's contingent could not cross the river. At night, Arkali Khan sent a raiding party to Chajju's camp on rafts and skiffs. The raids caused panic among Chajju's soldiers, who deserted their camp, and moved northwards. Arkali Khan plundered the deserted camp for two days, and then pursued the enemy. He came across Chajju's army at a Ramganga river crossing, and fought an indecisive battle. Meanwhile, Jalal-ud-din's army crossed the Ganges river at Bhojpur (near Farrukhabad), and engaged Chajju's supporters in another battle.

At night, an agent of Chajju's Hindu supporter Bhim Deva (Biram Deva Kotla according to Tarikh-i Mubarak Shahi) informed him that Jalal-ud-din would attack his army from rear. Chajju then secretly left the camp with some of his followers. In the morning, Arkali Khan crossed the river, and easily defeated the remaining army of Chajju. Chajju's supporters Alp Ghazi and Bhim Deva were killed, while Malik Masud and Malik Muhammad Balban were captured. The rest of Chajju's army then surrendered. Chajju himself took shelter in a walled village, but the village headman turned him over to Jalal-ud-din's army.

Aakali Khan then joined Jalal-ud-din, and the combined imperial army marched to the eastern districts to punish the chiefs who had supported Chajju. Some chiefs, such as that of Rupal, surrendered and saved themselves by offering heavy tributes. Others, such as that of Kahsun, faced plundering raids. The Hindu rebels were executed, and the Muslim rebels of Indian origin were sold as slaves.

Jalal-ud-din treated the Turkic Muslim rebels kindly, despite objections by his nephew Ahmad Chhap. When the imprisoned rebel nobles were brought to his camp in chains, he disapproved of their mistreatment. He ordered them to be released, dressed well and entertained. He invited the high-ranking rebel nobles, such as Amir Ali Sarjandar, to a feast. Even Malik Chajju, who was captured a few days later, was sent to an honourable confinement at Multan instead of being executed; his associates were released. Jalal-ud-din openly praised the rebels for their loyalty to their deceased master Balban. When Ahmad Chhap objected to such leniency, Jalal-ud-din declared that he was not habituated to killing Muslims, and argued that the pardoned nobles would be grateful to him and remain loyal to him.

== Mongol invasion ==
Sometime after Chajju's revolt, the Mongols invaded the north-west frontier of the Delhi Sultanate. The invasion was led by Abdullah, who was a grandson of Hallu (Hulagu Khan) according to Ziauddin Barani, and a son of "the prince of Khurasan" according to Yahya's Tarikh-i Mubarak Shahi.

The frontier provinces of Dipalpur, Multan, and Samana were governed by Jalal-ud-din's son Arkali Khan. Jalal-ud-din personally led an army to repulse the invaders. The two armies faced each other at a place named Bar-ram, and their vanguards engaged in some skirmishes. The skirmishes ended with advantage for the Delhi forces, and the Mongols agreed to retreat. Jalal-ud-din called Abdullah his son after exchanging friendly greetings.

A group of Mongols, led by Ulghu (another grandson of Hulagu), decided to embrace Islam, and sought Jalal-ud-din's permission to settle in India. In the Delhi Sultanate, the Mongols were regarded as hardened criminals, who had been involved in murders and highway robbery. Despite this, Jalal-ud-din accepted their regrets, and allowed them to settle in the lower Ganges plain, on the Lakhnauti (Bengal) frontier of his kingdom. He also provided the new settlers with accommodation, allowances and social ranks. These Mongols came to be known as "New Muslims".

== Ranthambore campaign ==
The Chahamana king Hammira-deva ruled a kingdom centred around Ranthambore, located to the south-west of Delhi. Hammira's expansionist policy had threatened the Ajmer and Haryana frontiers of the Delhi Sultanate, which prompted Jalal-ud-din to invade his kingdom.

=== Siege of Mandawar ===
Jalal-ud-din marched via Rewari and Narnaul to reach the Alwar frontier of Hammira's kingdom. He first besieged fortress of Mandawar (called "Mandor" by Ziauddin Barani and Yahya Sirhindi). Mandawar was once a part of the Delhi Sultanate, but had been lost to the Chahamanas in the preceding years; Jalal-ud-din recaptured it in 1292. After this victory, he raided the countryside, obtaining a large number of cattle.

According to Yahya's Tarikh-i Mubarak Shahi, the siege of Mandawar lasted for four months. However, historian A. B. M. Habibullah believes that this was the duration of the entire Ranthambore campaign, including the sieges of Mandawar, Jhain and Ranthambore.

Jalal-ud-din's eldest son, Khan-i Khanan, died on the eve of the Mandawar campaign.

=== Battle of Jhain ===
In 1291, Jalal-ud-din marched across the Karauli region to Jhain, a town that guarded the approaches to the Chahamana capital Ranthambore. A reconnaissance party of the Delhi army, led by Qara Bahadur, defeated a Chahamana contingent. Jalal-ud-din then sent a larger detachment to besiege the Jhain fort. When the invaders reached within two farsangs of the fort, a Chahamana army led by Gardan Saini came out of the fort and engaged them in a battle. The Delhi army emerged victorious, and Gardan Saini was killed in action. The invaders then pursued the retreating Chahamana soldiers across Chambal, Kunwari and Banas rivers. The remaining Chahamana contingents stationed at Jhain then evacuated the fort, and retreated to Ranthambore.

Following this victory, the invaders engaged in plunder, and dismantled the Jhain fort. Jalal-ud-din, an iconoclast, broke the non-Islamic idols, although he admired their sculpture and carvings.

Three days after this, the Shah entered Jhain at midday and occupied the private apartment of the rai He then visited the temples, which were ornamented with elaborate work in gold and silver. Next day he went again to the temples, and ordered their destruction, as well as of the fort, and set fire to the palace, and thus made hell of paradise. While the soldiers sought every opportunity of plundering, the Shah was engaged in burning the temples, and destroying the idols. There were two bronze idols of Brahma each of which weighed more than a thousand mans. These were broken into pieces and the fragments distributed amongst the officers, with orders to throw them down at the gates of the masjid on their return.

— Miftahul-Futuh

The Miftah al-Futuh, written by his courtier Amir Khusrau, claims that thousands of defenders were killed in the siege of Jhain, while the Delhi army lost only one Turkic soldier.

The Sultan was always hostile to Hindus. According to Ziauddin Barani, Jalaluddin is believed to have said.

What is our defense of the faith, that we suffer these Hindus, who are the greatest enemies to god (Allah) and of the religion of Mustafa, to live in comfort and do not flow streams of their blood

=== Siege of Ranthambore ===
After conquering Jhain, Jalal-ud-din ordered his army to besiege the Ranthambore Fort, which was situated on a steep hill, and was reputed to be impregnable. He issued orders for the construction of siege engines such as maghrabis (catapults), sabats, gargajes, and a pasheb (mound to reach the hilltop). According to the Delhi chronicler Ziauddin Barani, he abandoned the siege when he came out to inspect the progress of the construction, and realized the ensuing siege would cost many Muslim lives. Barani states that Jalal-ud-din declared he would not risk the hair of a single Muslim for "ten such forts". Jalal-ud-din's nephew Ahmad Chap opposed this decision saying that it would embolden the Hindus, and asked him to emulate the earlier Muslim kings such as Mahmud and Sanjar, "whose undoubted piety never limited their kingly action." But Jalal-ud-din argued that the comparisons to Mahmud and Sanjar were unfair, because their dominions did not include "a single idolater".

== Invasion of Javalipura ==
According to the Gujarati chronicler Jinaprabha Suri, in 1291-92 CE (1398 VS), the Jalaluddin invaded the Chāhamāna kingdom of Javalipura during the early reign of Chahamana ruler Samantasimha. However, Samantasimha's southern neighbour, Sarangadeva the Vaghela king of Gujarat, came to his rescue. Jalaluddin's army advanced up to Sanchore, but was forced to retreat by Sarangadeva, who was perhaps concerned that the Delhi Sultan would invade Gujarat next.

== Conspiracies against Jalal-ud-Din ==
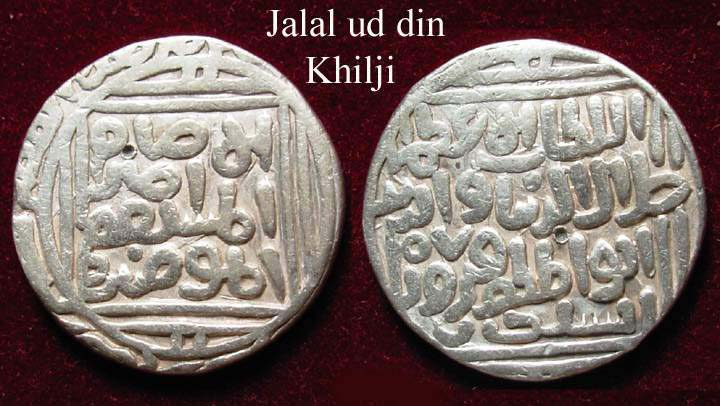
A coin of Jalal-ud-Din Khalji

=== Conspiracy of Tajuddin Kuchi ===
Several of Jalal-ud-Din's courtiers believed that he was a weak king, who could not inspire the necessary fear among his subjects and the enemies of the Sultanate. During the Ranthambore campaign, some of his closest associates met at the house of Malik Tajuddin Kuchi. In a drunken stupor, they talked about killing Jalal-ud-Din and raising Tajuddin to throne.

When Jalal-ud-din became aware of this, he summoned the erring courtiers to a private conference. But instead of punishing them, he shamed them by daring them to kill him with his own sword. The courtiers asked for forgiveness, attributing their behavior to drunkenness, with Nusrat Sabbah making a "clever and flattering confession". The meeting ended with wine-drinking and poetry recitals by Jalal-ud-Din.

=== Alleged conspiracy of Sidi Maula ===
Jalal-ud-Din was lenient towards his detractors, and even the most persistent detractors were only banished to their iqtas for one year. The only instance in which he meted out more severe punishments was during the alleged conspiracy of Sidi Maula.

Sidi Maula was a foreign-born religious leader, who belonged to a sect of unorthodox Muslim dervishes. He owned a huge khanqah, and had been reputed for his vast charities since the reign of Qaiqabad. His institution attracted most of the dispossessed Balban-era umara and officers. His followers also included Jalal-ud-Din's nobles, including Qazi Jalal Kashani and the now-deceased crown prince Khan-i Khanan.

Sidi Maula allegedly planned to kill Jalal-ud-Din to become khalifa, although these allegations were never proven. According to a near-contemporary account, the allegations were first made by the jealous dervishes of a rival sect. It was alleged that Sidi Maula had asked Hathya Paik and Niranjan Kotwal to assassinate Jalal-ud-Din on a Friday. These two were Balban-era Hindu officers (pahilwans or wrestlers, according to Ziauddin Barani). Malik Ulghu, the Mongol commander who had entered Jalal-ud-Din's service, reported the allegations to Arkali Khan, while Jalal-ud-Din was busy besieging Mandawar. Arkali Khan, who disliked the associates of his elder brother Khan-i Khanan, accepted the allegations as true, and arrested the alleged conspirators.

When Jalal-ud-Din returned to Delhi, the alleged conspirators were brought before him, and pleaded not guilty. The orthodox Muslim ulama, who were unable to present any concrete evidence against the accused, suggested a trial by fire. When Jalal-ud-Din was convinced that the accused were guilty, he ordered the Hindu conspirators Hathya and Niranjan to be executed. He then banished Qazi Jalal Kashani and the Balban-era officers who followed Sidi Maula. Next, Jalal-ud-Din turned to Sidi Maula, and lost his composure when Sidi Maula repeatedly denied his involvement in the conspiracy. An annoyed Jalal-ud-Din asked a group of qalandars to knife Sidi Maula. Arkali Khan later had the wounded Sidi Maula crushed under the feet of an elephant.

Sidi Maula's execution was followed by a severe dust storm, and a drought resulting from the failure of seasonal rains. These conditions resulted in a severe famine, during which the prices of foodgrains became exorbitant, and a number of people committed suicide by jumping into the Yamuna River. Sidi Maula's admirers considered these unfortunate events as proof of his innocence.

== Ali Gurshasp's conspiracy ==
After deposing Malik Chajju, Jalal-ud-din had appointed his nephew Ali Gurshasp (later Sultan Alauddin Khalji) as the governor of Kara (on the banks of Ganges, 69 km west of the city of Allahabad in present Kaushambi district in Uttar Pradesh). Ali's father had died when he was young, and Jalal-ud-din had brought him and his brother Almas Beg (later Ulugh Khan) up. Jalal-ud-din had also married his daughters to Ali and Almas. Ali's domestic life was miserable, as he was not on good terms with his wife and his mother-in-law, and he wanted to end his dependence on Jalal-ud-din's family. At Kara, the former supporters of Malik Chajju instigated him to overthrow Jalal-ud-din.

To raise money for a coup against Jalal-ud-din, Ali raided Bhilsa in 1293. Bhilsa was a temple town in the Paramara kingdom of Malwa, which had already been weakened by Vaghela, Chahamana, and Yadava invasions. As a result of this raid, he obtained a large number of cattle and precious metals. During his stay in Bhilsa, he learned about the immense wealth of the southern Yadava kingdom, as well as the routes leading to their capital Devagiri (present-day Daulatabad in Maharashtra). He shrewdly surrendered the loot from Bhilsa to Jalal-ud-din to win the Sultan's confidence, but withheld the information on the Yadava kingdom. Pleased with the loot, Jalal-ud-din gave Ali the office of Ariz-i Mamalik, which was once held by Ali's father. He also granted Ali the governorship of Awadh in addition to that of Kara-Manikpur. He also granted Ali's request to use the surplus revenue for enlisting additional troops to raid the other wealthy but weakly-defended territories beyond Chanderi.

Over the next few years, Ali secretly planned a raid on Devagiri. In 1296, he set out for Devagiri with an 8,000-strong cavalry. He left the administration of Kara to Alaul Mulk, who misled Jalal-ud-din's administration in Delhi about Ali's real destination. At Devagiri, Ali collected a large amount of wealth. When Jalal-ud-din heard about Ali's success at Devagiri, he was pleased at the prospect of a vast treasure coming to him. He moved to Gwalior, hoping that Ali would come there to meet him en route to Kara. However, Ali marched directly towards Kara. Jalal-ud-din's councillors, such as Ahmad Chap, advised him to intercept Ali at Kara, but Jalal-ud-din trusted his nephew, and returned to Delhi. In Delhi, Ali's brother Almas Beg assured the Sultan of Ali's loyalty.

After reaching Kara, Ali sent Jalal-ud-din a detailed report on the raid, and expressed concern that his enemies may have poisoned Jalal-ud-din's mind against him. He asked for a signed letter of pardon, which Jalal-ud-din dispatched immediately. At Kara, Jalal-ud-din's messengers were astonished when they learned about Ali's military strength and his plans to dethrone Jalal-ud-din. Ali detained them, and prevented them from communicating with Delhi. Meanwhile, Almas Beg convinced Jalal-ud-din that Ali always carried poison in his handkerchief and would commit suicide out of guilt, if not personally pardoned by Jalal-ud-din. A gullible Jalal-ud-din, concerned about his beloved nephew, asked Almas to visit Kara and dissuade Ali from committing suicide, promising to visit Kara himself shortly after.

== Assassination and legacy ==
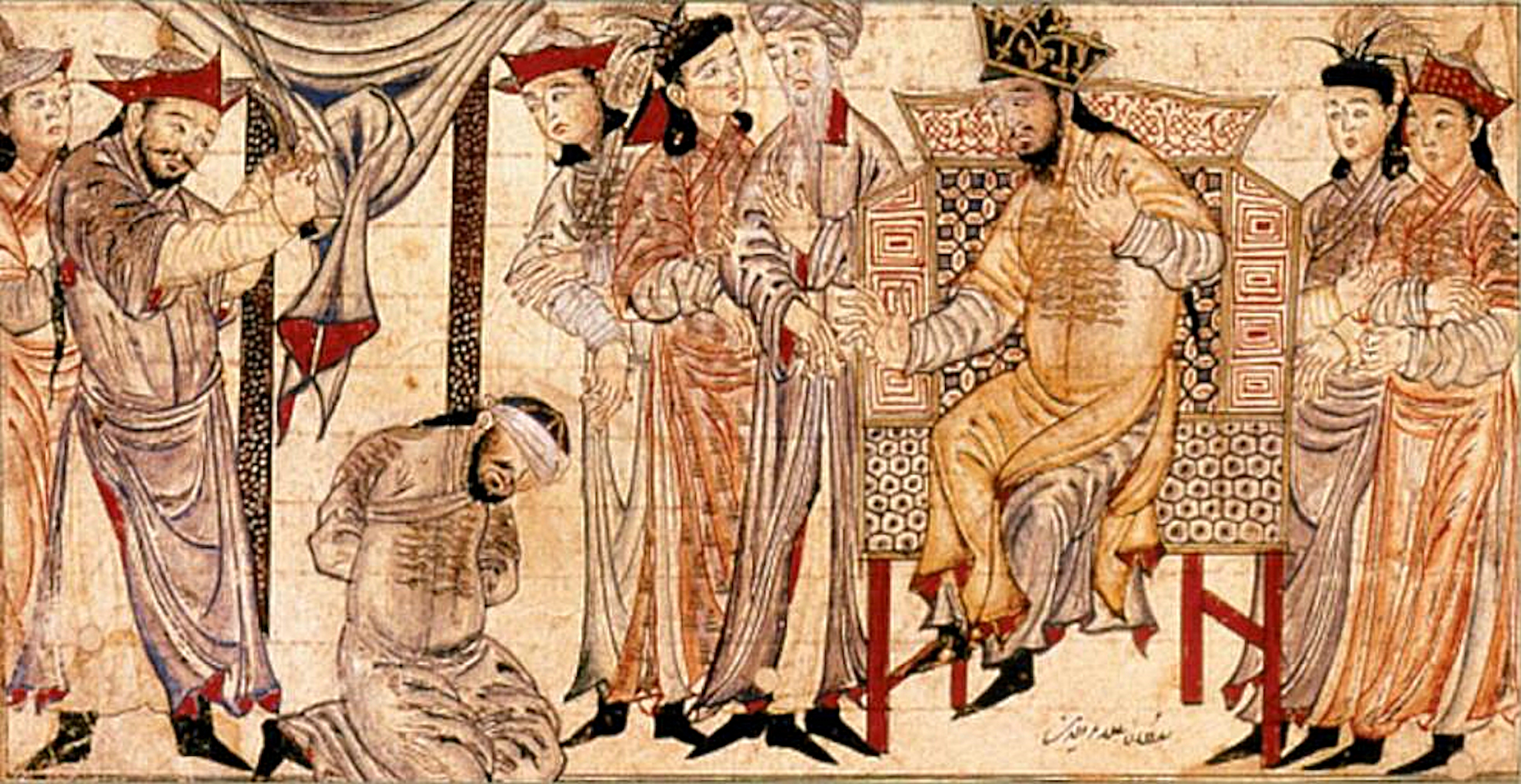
The Execution of Jalal-ud-Din Khalji (r 1290-96), with the usurper Alauddin Khalji enthroned. Jami al-Tawarikh (1314 painting).

In July 1296, Jalal-ud-din marched to Kara with a large army to meet Ali during the holy month of Ramzan. He directed his commander Ahmad Chap to take the major part of the army to Kara by land, while he himself journeyed down the Ganges River with 1,000 soldiers. When Jalal-ud-din's entourage came close to Kara, Ali sent Almas Beg to meet him. Almas Beg convinced Jalal-ud-din to leave behind his soldiers, saying that their presence would frighten Ali into committing suicide. Jalal-ud-din boarded a boat with a few of his companions, who were made to unbuckle their weapons. As they rode the boat, they saw Ali's armed troops stationed along the riverbank. Almas told them that these troops had been summoned to accord a worthy reception to Jalal-ud-din. Jalal-ud-din complained about Ali's lack of courtesy in not coming to greet him at this point. However, Almas convinced him of Ali's loyalty by saying that Ali was busy arranging a presentation of the loot from Devagiri and a feast for him.

Satisfied by this explanation, Jalal-ud-din continued his journey to Kara, reciting Quran on the boat. When he landed at Kara, Ali's retinue greeted him, and Ali ceremoniously threw himself at his feet. Jalal-ud-din lovingly raised Ali, gave him a kiss on cheek, and chided him for doubting his uncle's affection. At this point, Ali signaled his follower Muhammad Salim, who struck Jalal-ud-din with his sword twice. Jalal-ud-din survived the first blow, and ran towards his boat, but the second blow killed him. Ali raised the royal canopy over his head, and proclaimed himself the new Sultan. Jalal-ud-din's head was put on a spear and paraded across Ali's provinces of Kara-Manikpur and Awadh. His companions on the boat were also killed, and Ahmad Chap's army retreated to Delhi.

According to the contemporary writer Amir Khusrau, Ali ascended the throne (as Alauddin Khalji) on 19 July 1296 (16 Ramazan 695). The later writer Ziauddin Barani dates Jalal-ud-din's death and Ali's ascension to 20 July 1296, but Amir Khusrau is more reliable.

=== Cultural activities and In popular culture ===
Jalal-ud-din's courtier Amir Khusrau wrote Miftah al-Futuh (1291) to commemorate his victories.

- Jalal-ud-din is portrayed by Raza Murad in Sanjay Leela Bhansali's epic film Padmaavat (2018).
