= Alp Khan =

General of the Delhi Sultanate

Alp Khan (died December 1315) was a general and brother-in-law of the Delhi Sultanate ruler Alauddin Khalji. He served as Alauddin's governor of Gujarat, and held considerable influence at the royal court of Delhi during the last years of Alauddin's life. He was executed on the charges of conspiring to kill Alauddin, possibly because of a conspiracy by Malik Kafur.

== Early life ==
Alp Khan was originally named Junaid, and was later called Malik Sanjar. He appears to have come from a family of Khalji chiefs. According to Isami, Alauddin had brought him up as a child.

Upon becoming the Sultan of Delhi in 1296, Alauddin gave him the title Alp Khan ("Powerful Khan"). Alp Khan's sister (named Mahru, according to the 16th-17th century chronicler Haji-ud-Dabir) married Alauddin: Khizr Khan was the issue of this marriage.

== Career ==
Alauddin appointed Alp Khan as Amir-i-Majlis (chief of protocol), and granted him the iqta' of Multan. In c. 1310, Alauddin granted Alp Khan the iqta' of Gujarat. The Jain works praise Alp Khan for allowing reconstruction of the shrines destroyed by the Muslim conquerors. Kakka Suri's Nabhi-nandana-jinoddhara-prabandha records the Shatrunjaya temple renovation permitted by him.

In 1308, Alauddin ordered Alp Khan to support Malik Kafur during the invasion of Devagiri. Alp Khan's forces invaded Baglana, where the Vaghela king Karna had been given a principality by the Devagiri ruler Ramachandra. Alp Khan's soldiers were unable to apprehend Karna, but managed to capture Karna's daughter Devaladevi. Alp Khan sent her to Delhi, where she was married to his nephew Khizr Khan.

== Death ==
Alp Khan's daughters married Alauddin's sons Khizr Khan and Shadi Khan. As the maternal uncle and the father-in-law of the heir apparent Khizr Khan, Alp Khan held considerable influence at the Delhi court, especially during the last years of Alauddin's life. In 1315, when Alauddin suffered from a serious illness, Alp allegedly vied with Alauddin's slave-viceroy Malik Kafur for control of power. Kafur convinced Alauddin to sanction the murder of Alp Khan. It was alleged that Alp Khan, his sister and Khizr Khan had conspired to poison Alauddin in order to make Khizr Khan the new king. However, this might have been Kafur's propaganda.
