= Wassaf =

14th-century Persian historian

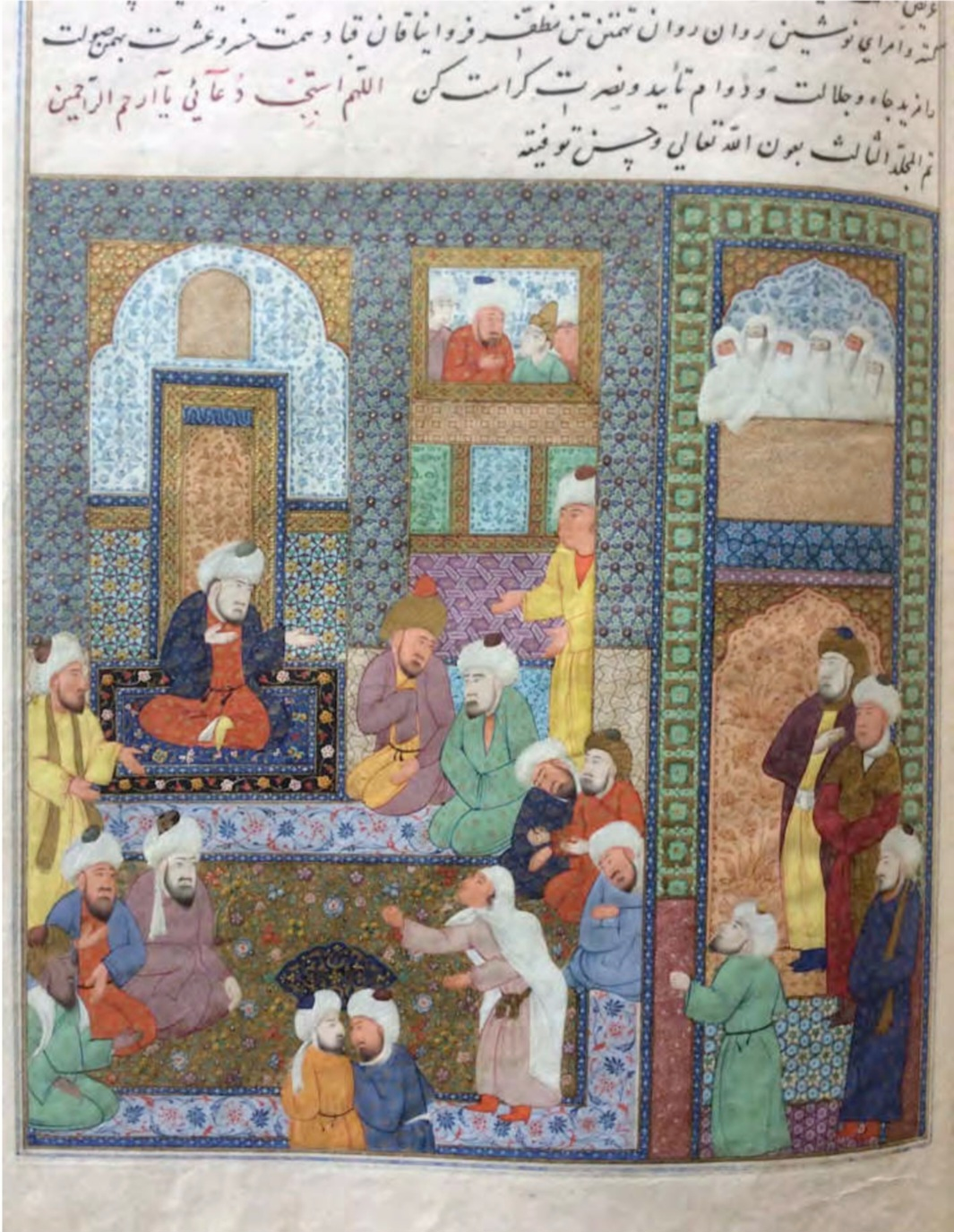
Copy of Wassaf's Tarikh-i Wassaf, created for the Timurid prince, Baysunghur.

Abdallah ibn Faḍlallah Sharaf al-Din Shīrāzī (Persian: عبدالله ابن فضل‌الله شرف‌الدین شیرازی; fl. 1265–1328), called Wassaf or Vassaf, was a Persian historian of the Ilkhanate. Waṣṣāf, sometimes lengthened to Waṣṣāf al-Ḥaḍrat or Vassaf-e Hazrat (Persian: وصّافِ حضرت), is a title meaning "court panegyrist".

A native of Shiraz, Wassaf was a tax administrator in Fars during the reigns of Ghazan Mahmud and Öljaitü. He is the author of the historical work Tārīkḣ-i Waṣṣāf, also known as Tajziyat al-amṣār wa-tazjiyat al-a'ṣār (The allocation of cities and the propulsion of epochs).

== Tarikh-i Wassaf ==
His history, Tajziyat al-amṣār wa-tazjiyat al-a'ṣār (The allocation of cities and the propulsion of epochs) also called Tārīkḣ-i Waṣṣāf, was conceived as a continuation of Juwayni's Tārīkḣ-i Jahāngushāy whose account of the rise of the Mongol Empire ended in 1257.

Tārīkḣ-i Waṣṣāf consisted of an introduction and five volumes. The first volume (first part) only was edited and translated by Joseph von Hammer-Purgstall, published 1855.

Wassaf's florid style of prose is not easily followed by modern readers, and an abridged version entitled the Taḥrīr-i Tārīkḣ-i Waṣṣāf (1346/1967) has been edited by ʿAbd al-Muḥammad Āyatī.
