= Ziauddin Barani =

Indian Muslim historian and political thinker (1285–1357)

- ضیاء الدین برنی
- Born: Ziauddin Barani; 1285; Baran, Delhi Sultanate (modern-day Bulandshahr, India)
- Died: 1357 (aged 71–72); Delhi Sultanate
- Occupations: Historian, Political Thinker
- Title: Nadim (Companion) of Sultan Muhammad bin Tughluq

Academic background
- Influences: Sufi Mysticism

Academic work
- Era: Delhi Sultanate
- Notable works: Tarikh-i-Firoz Shahi, Fatwa-i-Jahandari

Ziauddin Barani (Urdu: ضیاء الدین برنی; 1285–1357) was an Indian political thinker of the Delhi Sultanate located in present-day northern India during Muhammad bin Tughlaq and Firuz Shah's reign. He was best known for composing the Tarikh-i-Firoz Shahi (also called Tarikh-i-Firuz Shahi), a work on medieval India, which covers the period from the reign of Ghiyath al-Din Tughluq to the first six years of the reign of Firoz Shah Tughluq; and the Fatwa-i-Jahandari which promoted a hierarchy among Muslim communities in the Indian subcontinent, although according to M. Athar Ali it was not based on race or even like the caste system, but taking as a model of Sassanid Iran, which promoted an idea of aristocracy through birth and which was claimed by Persians to be "fully in accordance with the main thrust of Islamic thought as it had developed by that time", including in the works of his near-contemporary Ibn Khaldun.

== Life ==
Barani was born in 1285, to an Indian Muslim family native to Baran, (now Bulandshahr) in northern India, hence his nisba Barani. His ancestors had immigrated to Baran from the Indian town of Kaithal, Haryana but considered themselves originally natives of Baran itself. His father, uncle, and grandfather all worked in high government posts under the Sultan of Delhi. His maternal grandfather: Husam-ud-Din, was an important officer of Balban and his father Muwayyid-ul-Mulk held the post of naib of Arkali Khan, the son of Jalal-ud-Din Firuz Khalji. His uncle Qazi Ala-ul-Mulk was the Kotwal (police chief) of Delhi during the reign of Ala-ud-Din Khalji. Barani never held a post, but was a nadim (companion) of Muhammad bin Tughluq for seventeen years. During this period he was very close to Amir Khusrau. After Tughlaq died, he fell out of favor. In "Exile" he wrote two pieces dealing with government, religion, and history, which he hoped would endear him to the new sultan, Firuz Shah Tughlaq. He was not rewarded for his works and died poor in 1357.

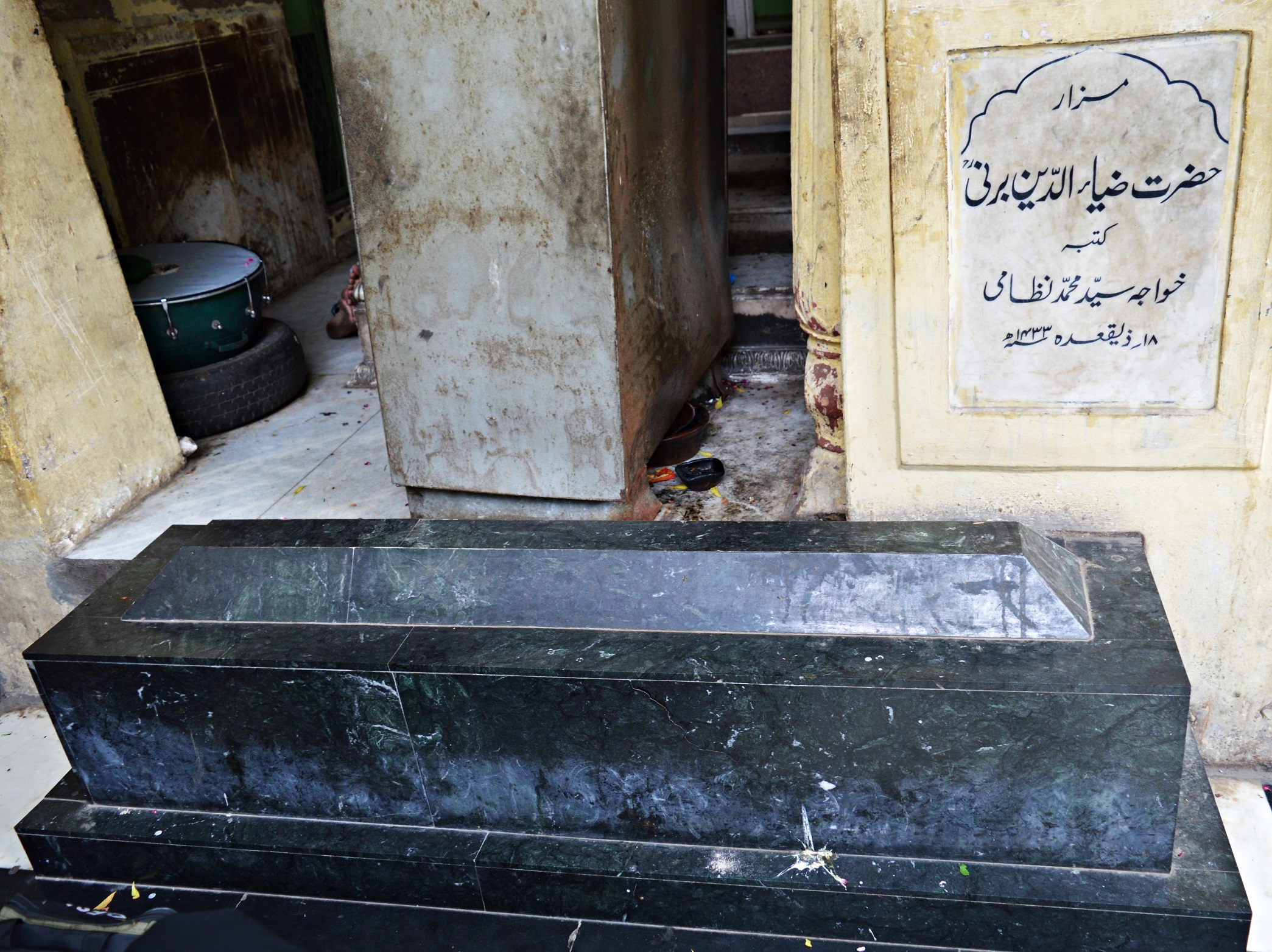
Tombstone of Barani

His gravestone lies in the courtyard of Nizamuddin Auliya's dargah in Delhi, at the entrance of the dalan of Mirdha Ikram, and near the tomb of Amir Khusrau.

== Works ==
=== Fatwa-i-Jahandari ===
The Fatwa-i-Jahandari is a work containing the political ideals to be pursued by a Muslim ruler in order to earn religious merit and the gratitude of his subjects. It is written as nasihat (advices) for the Muslim kings.

His fatwa would condone segregation of the Muslim ashraf upper castes and ajlaf low castes, in addition to the azral under-castes or the converted Muslims who are regarded as "ritually polluted" by the ashraf. Muzaffar Alam argues that, contrarily to what many think, through this aristocratic view of power he doesn't follow secular models (Iranian or Indian), "rather, the interests of the Muslim community define the contours of his ideas on the heredity question", as he saw that during times of political troubles "frequent changes within ruling classes lead to the ruination of illustrious Muslim families", and thus preserving these upper class families, themselves at such place for diverse administrative or military qualities, would lead to the advent of more capable rulers and in the longer run help Muslim interests, Alam to conclude that this hierarchization "was a conscious choice exercised by Barani to serve the narrowly sectarian interests of the early Islamic regime in India".

The work delves into aspects of religion and government and the meeting of those two, as well as political philosophy. He notes:

Religion and temporal government are twins; that is, head of religion and the head of government are twin brothers.

Barani's Fatwa-i-Jahandari provides an example of his views on religion. He states that there is no difference between a Muslim king and a Hindu ruler, if the Muslim king is content in collecting jizya (poll-tax) and khiraj (tribute) from the Hindus. Instead, he recommends that a Muslim king should concentrate all his power on jihad (holy wars) and completely uproot the "false creeds". According to him, a Muslim king could establish the supremacy of Islam in India only by slaughtering the Brahmins. He recommends that a Muslim king "should make a firm resolve to overpower, capture, enslave and degrade the infidels."

At the same time, the book makes it clear that the kings of the Delhi Sultanate did not hold similar views. Barani rues that they honoured and favoured the Hindus, and had granted them the status of dhimmis (protected persons). The Muslim kings appointed Hindus to high posts, including governorships. Barani further laments that the Muslim kings were pleased with the prosperity of Hindus in their capital Delhi, even when poor Muslims worked for them and begged at their doors.

=== Tarikh-i-Firuz Shahi ===
The Tarikh-i-Firuz Shahi or Tarikh-i-Firoz Shahi (Firuz Shah's History) (1357) was an interpretation of the history of the Delhi Sultanate up to the then-present Firuz Shah Tughlaq. Then interpretation noted that the sultans who followed the rules of Barani had succeeded in their endeavors while those that did not, or those who had sinned, met the nemesis.

But, though Barani refers many times to the sources of information, he did not consult his contemporary works. This resulted in the sketchy description of Ala-ud-Din Khalji’s wars in Chittor, Ranthambhor and Malwa and the Deccan campaigns of Malik Kafur. The later medieval historians, Nizam-ud-Din Ahmad, ʽAbd al-Qadir Badayuni, Firishta and Haji-ud-Dabir depended upon the Tarikh-i-Firuz Shahi for their account of history of the period covered in this work. Abd al-Haqq al-Dehlawi in his Akhbar-ul-Akhyar depended upon the work for the biographical sketches of Nizam-ud-Din Auliya and the other Sufi saints.

Zawabit

Barani categorized the law into two kinds, the Sharia and the Zawabit. The Zawabit were the state laws formulated by the monarch in consultation with the nobility in the changed circumstances to cater to the new requirements which the Sharia was unable to fulfill.

The Zawabit, he said must be in the spirit of the Shariat and enumerated four conditions for its formulation as guidelines. They are as follows:

- The Zawabit should not negate the Sharia.
- It must increase the loyalty and hope among the nobles and common people towards the Sultan
- Its sources and inspiration should be the Sharia and pious Caliphs
- If at all it had to negate the Sharia out of exigencies, it must follow charities and compensation in lieu of that negation

=== Other works ===
- Salvat-i-Kabir (The Great Prayer)
- Sana-i-Muhammadi (Praises of Muhammad)
- Hasratnama (Book of Regrets)
- Tarikh-i-Barmaki
- Inayat Nama-i-Ilahi (Book of Gods' Gifts)
- Ma'asir Sa'adat (Good Deeds of the Sayyids)
- Lubbat at-Tarikh
- Fatawa-i-Dindari

== See also ==
- Caste system among South Asian Muslims
- List of Muslim historians
