= Delhi Sultanate literature =

Medieval Indian literature

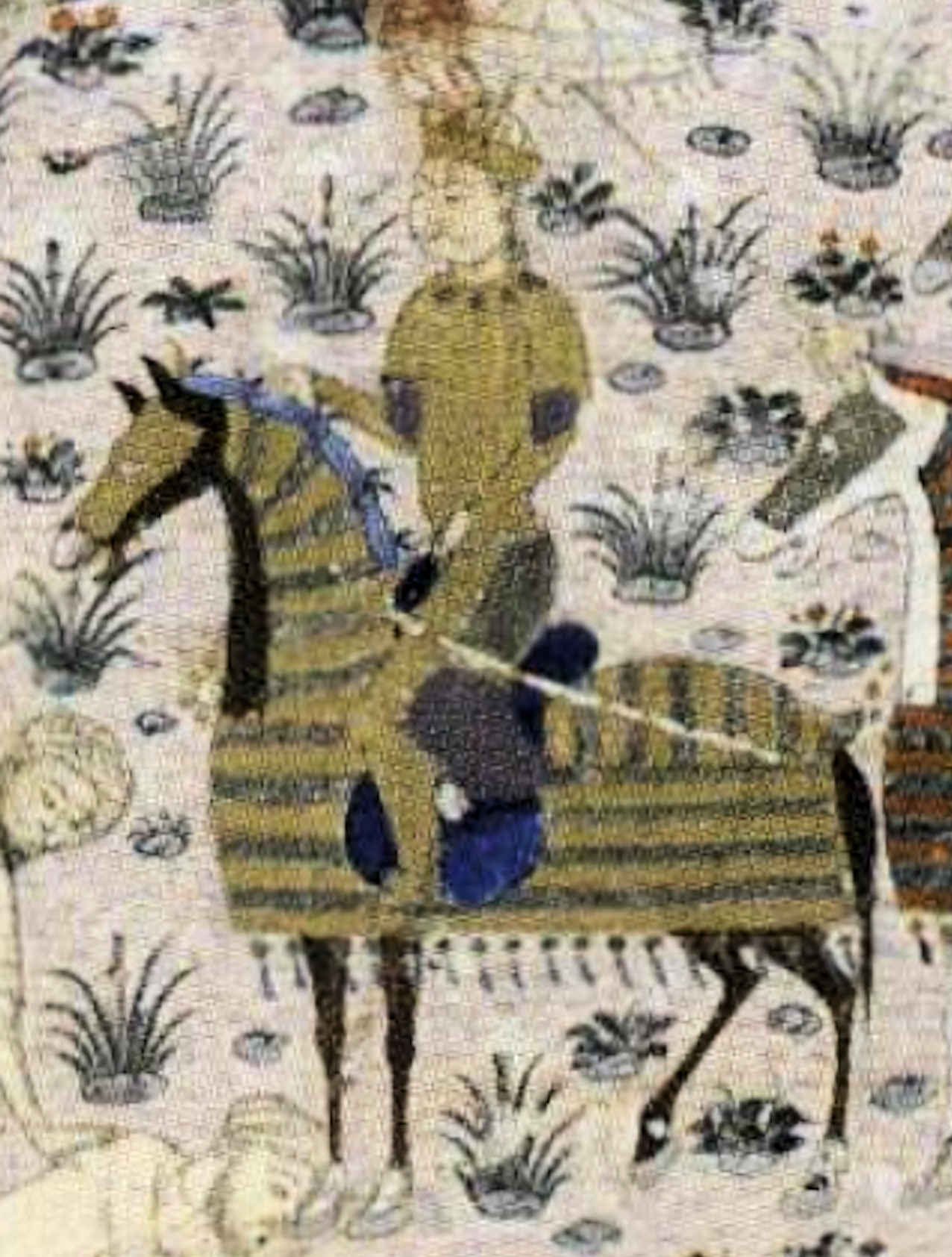
Depiction of Ghiyath al-Din Tughluq, founder of the Tughlaq dynasty, in the Basātin al-uns by Ikhtisān-i Dabir, a member of the Tughluq court and an ambassador to Iran. Ca.1410 Jalayirid copy of 1326 lost original.

The literature of the Delhi Sultanate began with the rise of Persian-speaking people to the throne of the Sultanate of Delhi, naturally resulted in the spread of the Persian language in India. It was the official language and soon literary works in the language began to appear. Initially Persian literature talked about topics which were familiar to those from Persia. Gradually however as more Indians learnt the language, the literary works began to have a more Indian theme. Amir Khusrau was a noted writer of the period, who was one of the first writers to write Persian literature about events concerning India. His inspiration came from events he saw around, his work soon grew to be appreciated and he became a court poet.

== Origin ==
Urdu developed during early 11th century Muslim invasions of Punjab from Central Asia, although the name "Urdu" did not exist at the time for the language. Urdu literature originated some time around the 14th century in present-day North India among the sophisticated gentry of the courts. The continuing traditions of Islam and patronisations of foreign culture centuries earlier by Muslim rulers, usually of Turkic or Afghan descent, marked their influence on the Urdu language given that both cultural heritages were strongly present throughout Urdu territory. The Urdu language, with a vocabulary almost evenly split between Sanskrit-derived Prakrit and Arabo-Persian words, was a reflection of this cultural amalgamation.

== Sanskrit ==
Sanskrit continued to remain an important language of the time, and despite the increasing influence of Persian, it was able to hold its ground. Many preferred Sanskrit poets as they were more established and experienced than those that worked in the new languages. A centre for Sanskrit learning opened at Mithila (north Bihar). It preserved the tradition of classical Sanskrit literature and kept it alive. Sanskrit was however beginning to lose its popularity as an intellectual language, and the Brahmans struggled to find patrons to keep it alive.

== Regional languages ==
There was also a significant amount of work taking place in regional languages. Both Sanskrit and Persian were languages which the average person did not understand. Various regional languages flourished and soon literary work in these languages began to take place.

== See also ==
- Ananga Ranga, a 15th/16th-century sex manual
- Jawami ul-Hikayat, a 13th-century collection of anecdotes
- Tabaqat-i Nasiri, a 13th-century history of the world
- Urdu literature
