= Battle of Amroha =

14th-century battle in India

- Part of the Mongol invasions of India
Date	20 December 1305
Location	Amroha district 28.9043537°N 78.4673426°E
Result	Delhi Sultanate victory

Belligerents
Chagatai Khanate	Delhi Sultanate

Commanders and leaders
Ali Beg (POW); Tartaq (POW)	Malik Nayak

Strength
30,000–50,000	30,000

Casualties and losses
20,000 dead 9,000 (POW) (later executed)	Unknown
- Location of Amroha in present-day India

The Battle of Amroha was fought on 20 December 1305 between the armies of the Delhi Sultanate of India and the Mongol Chagatai Khanate of Central Asia. The Delhi force led by Malik Nayak defeated the Mongol army led by Ali Beg and Tartaq near Amroha in present-day Uttar Pradesh.

== Background ==
The Mongol Chagatai Khanate had invaded the Delhi Sultanate a number of times in the 13th century. After Alauddin Khalji ascended the throne of Delhi, four such invasions had been repulsed in 1297-98, 1298-99, 1299, and 1303. During the 1303 invasion, the Mongols managed to enter Alauddin's capital Delhi, which prompted him to take a series of steps to prevent further Mongol invasions. Alauddin started residing in the newly-constructed Siri Fort, repaired and built several frontier forts, and appointed powerful commanders in the frontier regions.

== Mongol march to India ==
Despite Alauddin's measures, a Mongol force led by Ali Beg invaded the Delhi Sultanate in 1305. The Delhi chronicler Ziauddin Barani describes Ali Beg as a descendant of Genghis Khan, but Ali Beg actually belonged to the Khongirad tribe. He was married to a Chinggisid princess, who was a descendant of Genghis Khan through Ögedei Khan.

Ali Beg was supported by the generals Tartaq and Taraghai (sometimes incorrectly transliterated as "Targhi"). This was Taraghai's third battle in India: he was a general in Qutlugh Khwaja's army during the 1299 invasion, and had led the 1303 invasion. However, this time, he appears to have returned once the invading army crossed the Jhelum River. Dawal Rani by the Delhi chronicler Amir Khusrau implies that he was later killed by his fellow Mongols.

After Taraghai's return, Ali Beg and Tartaq continued their march with towards present-day Punjab, India. According to Amir Khusrau, their army had 50,000 soldiers, although other chroniclers give lower numbers (as low as 30,000). The Punjab area was under the control of Alauddin's officer Malik Nayak, who was a Hindu convert to Islam. This officer is also called Naik, Manik, or Manak in some manuscripts; Isami wrongly calls him "Nanak". One manuscript of Amir Khusrau's Khaizan-ul-Futuh erroneously mentions the general's name as "Malik Nayb"; some later chroniclers read this as "Malik Na'ib" (which was the title of a post later held by Malik Kafur); based on this, `Abd al-Qadir Bada'uni wrongly names the general as Malik Kafur. Malik Nayak was a different officer, who held the title Akhurbeg-i-Maisrah (equivalent to "Master of the Horse"), and had been granted the iqta's of Samana and Sunam.

The Mongols did not attack any frontier forts in the territory administered by Malik Nayak. Expecting them to launch a direct attack on Delhi, Malik Nayak seems to have led his army to that city. However, unlike on the previous occasions, the Mongols did not attack Delhi this time. They knew that the city was heavily guarded, and the Mongol armies had been unable to capture it in the past. Therefore, they ransacked the territories at the foot of the Shivalik Hills, and then proceeded south-east to the Gangetic plains along the Himalayan foothills.

== Alauddin's response ==
Alauddin sent a 30,000-strong cavalry led by Malik Nayak to defeat the Mongols. Malik Nayak's subordinate commanders included Bahram Aibah, Tughluq, Mahmud Sartiah, Qarmshi, Qutta, Takli, and Tulak. This army faced the Mongols somewhere in present-day Amroha district on 20 December 1305.

The Mongols launched one or two weak attacks on the Delhi army. In the words of the Delhi chronicler Amir Khusrau, they were "like an army of mosquitoes which tries to move against a strong wind". The Delhi army inflicted a crushing defeat upon the invaders. According to another Delhi chronicler Ziauddin Barani, Alauddin captured 20,000 horses belonging to dead Mongols after the battle was won.

== Aftermath ==
Alauddin organized a grand durbar (court) in Delhi to receive Malik Nayak and his victorious army. Alauddin was seated on a throne at Chautra-i Subhani, and the Delhi army stood in double row, forming a long queue. According to Barani, a huge crowd gathered to see this event, leading to exorbitant increase in the price of a cup of water.

The Mongol commanders Ali Beg and Tartaq, who had surrendered, were presented before Alauddin with other Mongol prisoners. According to Amir Khusrau, Alauddin ordered some of the captives to be killed, and others to be imprisoned. However, Barani states that Alauddin ordered all captives to be killed by having them trampled under elephants' feet. The number of these captives was around 9,000. The 16th-century historian Firishta claims that the heads of 8,000 Mongols were used to build the Siri Fort commissioned by Alauddin.

Amir Khusrau and another chronicler Isami state that Alauddin spared the lives of Ali Beg and Tartaq (probably because of their high ranks). According to Amir Khusrau, one of these commanders died "without any harm being done to him", and the other was "left alone". He ambiguously adds that Alauddin "was so successful in sport that he took their lives in one game after another". According to Isami, Alauddin made the two Mongol commanders Amirs (officials with high status), and also gave each of them an India-born slave girl. Two months later, Tartaq started demanding answers about the fate of his army and his belongings, in a state of drunken stupor. As a result, Alauddin ordered him to be killed. Sometime later, Ali Beg was also killed because of "the evil in his heart".

Historian Peter Jackson speculates that Ali Beg and Tartaq might have been killed when a large number of Mongols in Delhi rebelled against Alauddin, prompting the Sultan to order a massacre of all the Mongols in his empire.
