= Battle of Lahrawat =

Battle fought between two factions of the Delhi Sultanate in 1320

- Part of Delhi Sultanate
| Date | 6 September 1320 |
| Location | Lahrawa, Delhi Sultanate |
| Result | Tughluq victory |

Belligerents
| Malik Tughluq's forces | Khusrau Khan's forces |

Commanders and leaders
| Malik Tughluq | Khusrau Khan |

Strength
| Around 500 soldiers at the end | Initially 10,000 Baradu horsemen |

Casualties and losses
| Severe losses during early battle | Significant losses, including Khusrau Khan fleeing |
- Tughluq ascended the throne as Ghiyath al-Din after the victory, Khusrau Khan was captured and executed

The Battle of Lahrawat was fought between two factions of the Delhi Sultanate in 1320. Malik Tughluq, the governor of Dipalpur, challenged the authority of Khusrau Khan, who had usurped the throne of Delhi. After defeating an army sent by Khusrau Khan at the Battle of Saraswati, Tughluq marched towards Delhi, and encamped at a plain called Lahrawat.

Khusrau Khan led an army against him, and inflicted severe losses on his camp. When Tughluq was left with around 500 soldiers, Khusrau Khan's soldiers turned their focus towards plundering the enemy baggage, believing they had won the battle. Taking advantage of this, Tughluq launched a direct attack on Khusrau Khan, forcing him to flee the battlefield. Subsequently, the rest of Khusrau Khan's army either fled or was defeated by Tughluq's force.

== Background ==
Khusrau Khan and Malik Tughluq served Sultan Qutbuddin Mubarak Shah, the ruler of the Delhi Sultanate. Khusrau Khan was a slave-general and lover of the Sultan, while Tughluq was a noble who served as the governor of Dipalpur province. In 1320, Khusrau Khan killed Mubarak Shah, and usurped the throne at Delhi. Tughluq opposed Khusrau Khan, and defeated an army sent by him at the Battle of Saraswati. Tughluq then captured Hansi, and marched towards Delhi via Madina, Mandauti, and Palam.

Khusrau Khan initially considered negotiating peace with Tughuq by surrendering to him the territory to the east of Palam. However, Khusrau Khan's counselors rejected the idea arguing that his image as a king would be hurt if he did not put up a fight, and Tughluq would reject the offer anyway. They suggested distributing money from the state treasury to ensure that the officers and soldiers remained loyal to Khusrau Khan. Amir Khusrau's Tughluq Nama, written under Tughluq's patronage, states that tens of millions of tankas (coins) were distributed among various nobles and officers, with Hindus getting double of what Muslims got (Khusrau Khan was of Hindu origin). Khusrau adds that this act ruined Khusrau Khan's prestige, and those who received the money felt no obligation to be loyal to him. Ziauddin Barani states that Khusrau Khan's administration gave every soldier two and a half years' salary apart from special grants (inams), and burned all records of expenditure.

== The armies ==
Both armies included Hindu and Muslim soldiers. According to the Tughluq Nama, half of Khusrau Khan's army was Hindu and the other half Muslim; this composition surprised both Hindu and Muslim soldiers, but they were friendly towards each other. The army was organized as follows:

- Right wing, led by:
  - Yusuf Sufi Khan
  - Kamaluddin Sufi
  - Shaista Khan, son of Qirrat Qamar
  - Kafur Muhrdar
  - Shihab naib-i-barbek
  - Qaisar khas hijab
  - Ambar Bughra Khan
  - Tigin, governor of Awadh
  - Bahauddin Dabir
- Left wing, led by:
  - Baradus (the social group from which Khusrau Khan came), commanded by Randhol Rai Rayan, Nag, Kajb Brahma, and Maldeva
  - Sumbul Hatim Khan, amir-i hajib
  - officers of all the diwans, including the minister of war
  - Talbagha Yaghda

Khusrau Khan's army included 10,000 Baradu horsemen stationed around the elephants.

According to Isami, Tughluq's army included:

- Central wing, led by Tughluq
- Vanguard, led by the Khokhar chief Gul Chandra
- A contingent stationed behind Tughluq, led by:
  - Ali Haidar
  - Sahij Rai, a Khokhar chief
- Left wing, led by:
  - Bahauddin (son of Tughluq's sister)
  - Bahram Aiba, the governor of Uchch
  - Yusuf shuhna-i pil
  - Nurmand, an Afghan chief
  - Kari, a Mongol convert to Islam
  - Asaduddin, son of Tughluq's brother

== The battle ==
On his way to Delhi, Tughluq encamped at Lahrawat, a plain to the west of the Yamuna River, and to the north of Siri. Khusrau Khan's army encamped in front of Hauz-i-Khas (then known as Hauz-i-Alai). On the night before the battle, his soldiers dug a small ditch in front of his camp, and built a mud wall behind it. During the night, one of his important officers - Ainul Mulk - fled to Ujjain-Dhar area in central India, although Tughluq became aware of this only in the morning.

Tughluq wanted to delay the battle to better prepare for the fight. However, on a Friday morning, Khusrau Khan launched an attack on Tughluq's camp, forcing him to engage in battle. According to the chroniclers Barani and Isami, Khusrau Khan's army dominated the early part of the battle, and only 300 soldiers in Tughluq's wing survived the attack. The Baradus, led by Randhol and Kajb Brahma, attacked the contingent commanded by Tughluq's son Malik Jauna. Jauna's contingent moved from its position, allowing the Baradus to pass through towards Tughluq. Tughluq's brother Asaduddin moved from left to the centre to support Tughluq, but Bughra Khan and Talbagha led their units against him.

As Tughluq's units left their positions, Khusrau Khan ordered his general Shaista Khan to attack the baggage of Tughluq's army. Shaista Khan advanced to Tughluq's pavilion, cut its ropes, and announced that Tughluq had retreated. Khusrau Khan's soldiers then turned their focus towards plundering the enemy baggage. Taking advantage of this, Tughluq - whose army had only 500 soldiers left by this time - made a plan to kill Khusrau Khan. He attacked Khusrau Khan from the front, and ordered Gul Chandra to attack him from the rear. Khusrau Khan panicked and fled the battlefield to save his life. This caused a disarray in his army, and most of his soldiers also fled the battlefield. Gul Chandra killed the person bearing the royal canopy (chatr) of Khusrau Khan, and placed the canopy over Tughluq's head.

A part of Khusrau Khan's army, which included several elephants and was dominated by Hindus, remained in its position. According to Isami, these soldiers were a part of the left wing commanded by Sumbul Hatim Khan. According to Amir Khusrau's Tughluq Nama, these soldiers included units from the right wing, led by Yusuf Sufi Khan and Kafur Muhrdar. Tughluq defeated these remaining units, and thus, won the battle.

== Aftermath ==
According to Isami, Tughluq ordered a massacre of Baradus after his victory. The Baradu social group - to which Khusrau Khan belonged - perished as a result of this order. Those Baradus who had not been killed on the battlefield were massacred on the streets of Delhi the next day. According to Tughluq's courtier Amir Khusrau, Tughluq's officers rarely engaged in plundering, and the Muslim soldiers of his army generally did not mistreat the Muslim soldiers of the defeated army. However, the non-Muslim soldiers of Tughluq's army - including the Khokhars, Afghans, Mongols, and Meos - deprived the defeated soldiers of their possessions. According to Amir Khusrau, the Hindus among the defeated soldiers had no protection, and lost all their money, jewelry, and horses. The Muslims among the defeated soldiers were guaranteed their lives, but even they were vulnerable to plundering.

Tughluq subsequently ascended the throne of Delhi under the regnal name Ghiyath al-Din, with various nobles recognizing his authority. Khusrau Khan was captured and beheaded on Tughluq's orders.
