= Khusroe Khan =

Khusroe Khan (also spelled Khusrau Khan or Khusraw Khan or Khusrow Khan) may refer to:

- Amir Khusrow, Khusroe Khan, Amir - (1253-1325 CE)
- Khusro Khan, Khusroe Khan, Vizier - (d.1320 CE)
