= Battle of Saraswati =

1320 Delhi Sultanate factional battle

Date	1320
Location	Saraswati, a place on route between Dipalpur and Delhi
Result	Tughluq victory

Belligerents
Malik Tughluq's forces Khokhars	Khusrau Khan's forces

Commanders and leaders
Malik Tughluq	Khusrau Khan

Strength
Unknown	40,000 cavalry

Casualties and losses
Unknown	Unknown

The Battle of Saraswati was fought between two factions of the Delhi Sultanate in 1320, on the Delhi-Dipalpur route, at a place called Saraswati (or Sasuti), whose modern location is uncertain.

Khusrau Khan, who had usurped the throne of Delhi, sent an army against a rebel faction led by Ghazi Malik Tughluq, the governor of Dipalpur. Tughluq's forces decisively defeated the imperial army, and Tughluq subsequently ascended the throne of Delhi under the regnal name Ghiyath al-Din.

== Background ==
Khusrau Khan and Malik Tughluq served Sultan Qutbuddin Mubarak Shah, the ruler of the Delhi Sultanate. Khusrau Khan was a slave general of the Sultan, while Tughluq was a noble who served as the governor of Dipalpur province. On 9 July 1320, Khusrau Khan killed Mubarak Shah, and usurped the throne. Ghiyath al-Din's son Fakhruddin Jauna initially joined Khusrau Khan's government, but later conspired against the new Sultan, and fled to Dipalpur, where his father organized a resistance against the new Sultan. Khusrau Khan sent a cavalry against Tughluq, leading to a battle.

Isami, a 14th-century historian, calls the conflict the battle of Saraswati (or Sarsuti): the modern location of the battle is uncertain. According to chroniclers, the Dipalpur army passed by the Alapaur village and the Bhat tank. The Delhi army marched towards Dipalpur, without stopping at Sirsa, which was held by Tughluq's subordinate Muhammad Sartiah.

According to the Tughluq Nama, the Delhi army ended up marching ten karohs through the wilderness during night, because of a miscalculation. Because of this, when the two armies met in the morning, the Delhi soldiers were tired, thirsty, and "covered with dust".

== Organization ==
The Delhi army, which included 40,000 cavalries, was under the charge of Khan-i Khanan, who was stationed at its centre under a canopy. The vanguard of the army was led by Amir-i Shikar Malik Qutlugh. The left wing of the army was led by Talbagha Yaghda. The right wing comprised the members of the Baradu Hindu group (from which Khusrau Khan came): it was led by Kajb Brahma and Nag. There were separate columns for Hindu and Muslim horsemen, with the Hindus being led by Hindu chiefs (rawats).

Tughluq's army also comprised both Hindus and Muslims. Tughluq was stationed in at the centre of his army, with his son Fakhruddin Jauna in front of him. The vanguard of his army consisted of Khokhars led by the chiefs Gul Chandra (or Gul Chand) and Niju. Bahram Aiba led the army's left wing; Tughluq's nephews Asaduddin and Bahauddin led its right wing.

== The battle ==
According to Isami, the Khokhar vanguard of Tughluq's army launched a severe attack on the Delhi army, forcing its vanguard to flee to the centre. An arrow shot the horse of Qutlugh, the leader of the Delhi army's vanguard, and he fell. When the Khokhar soldiers surrounded him, he shouted that he was a major officer and should be taken to Tughluq. However, the Khokhars ignored him and beheaded him.

Khan-i Khanan, who held the formal charge of the Delhi army, had little experience in leading an army, and decided to flee when he saw his vanguard retreating towards him. The Khokhar chief Gul Chandra aggressively charged at the Delhi army's centre, and killed the person who bore the Khan-i Khanans royal parasol (chatr). He later brought the parasol to Tughluq, and placed it over Tughluq's head.

Khan-i Khanan fled the battlefield along with Yusuf Khan, Shaista Khan, and Qadr Khan. The Baradus do not appear to have engaged in fighting either.

== Aftermath ==
Tughluq forgave the Muslim captives from the Delhi army and provided good treatment for the wounded high-ranked captive Malik Tamar. He oversaw the collection of the spoils from the Delhi army, re-arranged his army, and then marched towards Delhi. He defeated Khusrau Khan's army at the Battle of Lahrawat: Khusrau Khan was later captured and executed, and Tughluq became the new Sultan of Delhi.
