= Market reforms of Alauddin Khalji =

Price controls and related reforms in Alauddin Khalji's empire

In the early 14th century, the Delhi Sultanate ruler Alauddin Khalji (reigned 1296–1316) instituted price controls and related reforms in his empire. He fixed the prices for a wide range of goods, including grains, cloth, slaves and animals. He banned hoarding and regrating, appointed supervisors and spies to ensure compliance with the regulations, and severely punished the violators. The reforms were implemented in the capital Delhi, and possibly, other areas of the Sultanate.

Alauddin's courtier Amir Khusrau states that Alauddin's objective was the welfare of the general public. However, Ziauddin Barani (c. 1357), the main source of information about the reforms, states that the Sultan's objective was to subjugate the Hindus and to maintain an unprecedentedly large army (the low prices would make low salaries acceptable for the soldiers). The reforms were revoked shortly after Alauddin's death, by his son Qutbuddin Mubarak Shah.

== Background ==
The main source of information about Alauddin's reforms is Ziauddin Barani, a Delhi Sultanate chronicler who wrote around half-a-century after Alauddin's death. Barani provides a numbered list of Alauddin's regulations, but his account does not contain the verbatim text of the royal orders. Barani's has reproduced the regulations from his memory, organizing them in a logical sequence.

Barani's account, at least his narration of Alauddin's price control measures, is corroborated by other writers who mention the reforms with lesser detail. Alauddin's courtier Amir Khusrau mentions the price control measures, attributing these to Alauddin's desire for public welfare. The 16th-century chronicler Firishta also describes the reforms, and besides Barani, his account seems to be based on Shaikh Ainuddin Bijapuri's now-lost Mulhiqat-i Tabaqat-i Nasiri. While Bijapuri was not a contemporary of Alauddin, he may have had access to other lost works that described these reforms.

== Objective ==
Alauddin's courtier Amir Khusrau, in his Khazainul Futuh (1311), states that Alauddin reduced and fixed prices because of his "great regard for general prosperity and abundance, and for the happiness and comfort of the select as well as the commons." A later anecdote also states that Alauddin implemented his price control measures for the welfare of the citizens. This anecdote was mentioned by the 14th century writer Hamid Qalandar, and is originally said to have been narrated by Malikut Tujjar ("Prince of Merchants") Qazi Hamiduddin to the Sufi saint Nasiruddin Chiragh Dehlavi, during the early reign of Firuz Shah Tughlaq (r. 1351–1388). Hamiduddin told Nasiruddin that he once entered Alauddin's chamber, and found him engaged in deep thought. Alauddin told Hamiduddin that he wanted to do something for the benefit of the common people, because the God had made him the leader of these people. Alauddin stated that he considered giving away all his treasures and property, but then realized that the benefits of such a distribution would not reach all the people. He then got the idea of lowering and fixing the price of grains, which would benefit all the people.

Contrary to these accounts, Barani states that Alauddin (who was a Muslim) introduced these reforms to be able to maintain an unprecedentedly large army, and to subjugate his Hindu subjects. According to Barani, the 1303 Mongol invasion of Delhi prompted Alauddin to raise a large army to deal with the Mongol threat. However, such a large army would be a drain on the state treasury, unless the soldiers' salaries could be lowered substantially. Alauddin was the first Sultan of Delhi to pay all his soldiers in cash. He determined that the maximum salary he could pay to a well-equipped cavalryman as 234 tankas, (Note: Tankas and jitals were contemporary units of currency. According to the 16th century historian Firishta, during Alauddin's period, a tanka was made of one tola of gold or silver. A jital was a copper coin: different sources variously describe its weight as 1 tola or 1.75 tolas. Firishta states that 1 silver tanka was equal to 50 jitals.) with an additional 78 tankas for a cavalryman with two horses. It appears that the cavalryman was expected to maintain his own horse and equipment from this salary. An increase in this salary would exhaust the treasury in 5–6 years. Alauddin's ministers told him that such low salaries would be acceptable to the soldiers, if the prices of necessary commodities were reduced. Alauddin then asked his counsellors for ways to reduce the prices without resorting to tyranny, and on their advice, decided to regulate the market prices.

Barani also states that the Hindu traders indulged in profiteering, and Alauddin wanted to punish the Hindus. However, much of Delhi's overland trade with Western and Central Asia was controlled by Khorasani and Multani merchants, many of whom were Muslims, and were impacted by Alauddin's reforms. Moreover, the cheap prices resulting from Alauddin's price control measures benefited the general public, which included the Hindus.

== Establishment of markets ==
Alauddin implemented price control measures by setting up following types of markets in Delhi:

1. Mandi, the central grain market, plus grocery shops in every neighbourhood
2. Sera-i Adl, the central market for manufactured commodities and imported goods
3. Markets for slaves and animals
4. General markets for other commodities

== Sahana-i-Mandi (grain market) ==
=== Price controls ===
Alauddin's administration fixed the price of grains in Delhi as follows:

Grain	Price (in jitals) per mann (Note: According to historian Satish Chandra, during Alauddin's time, 1 mann was approximately equivalent to 15 kg. Thus, 1 tanka could buy 96 kg of wheat, 144 kg of rice, and 180 kg of barley. However, according to Mohammad Habib, 1 mann was equivalent to 25.44 avoirdupois pounds or 11.54 kg.)
Wheat	7.5
Barley	4
Rice	5
Pulses and gram	5
Moth	3

The prices were lower in smaller towns. The Delhi Sultanate chronicles do not elaborate how these numbers were arrived at, but both Khusrau and Barani state that the prices were not allowed to increase during Alauddin's lifetime, even when the rainfall was scarce.

=== Appointment of market controller ===
Alauddin appointed Malik Qabul Ulugh Khani as controller of the grain markets, and a friend of Malik Qabul as an assistant controller. The Sultan granted Malik Qabul extensive territories as iqta', and placed a large cavalry and infantry under his charge. Alauddin also appointed one of his own close associates as an intelligence officer of the grain market.

The controller strictly regulated the market prices, and informed Alauddin of any violations. The government strictly punished the shopkeepers who tried to sell goods above the regulated price, and those who tried to cheat by using false weights. The traders considered Alauddin's regulations as burdensome, and frequently violated them; the drastic punishments led to further resentment among the traders.

=== Government-run granaries ===
Alauddin's administration set up granaries, and stocked them with grain collected from the peasants. According to Barani, the government's share of the grain in the crown territory (khalisa) in the Doab region was collected in kind, and taken to the government-run granaries in Delhi. In the Jhain region, half of the government's share was collected in kind and taken to the Jhain town; when needed, the stores were transferred to the government-run granaries in Delhi. Firishta mentions that the government's share was collected and stored in various towns, not just Delhi.

The stores in the government-run granaries were released and sold at fixed price during the times of scarcity.

=== Anti-hoarding measures ===
Alauddin's administration mandated registration for the transporters who bought the farming produce from the peasants and carried it to the towns. The government banned hoarding, and held the transporters, their agents and their families collectively responsible for any violations.

Alauddin placed the transporters under the controller of the grain market. His administration arrested the former leaders of the transporters, and handed them over to the controller, Malik Qabul. Alauddin asked Malik Qabul to keep them in chains until they collectively agreed to abide by certain conditions imposed on them, and gave sureties for each other. These conditions required the transporters to adhere to Alauddin's regulations. The transporters were also ordered to settle in the villages at specific distances along the Yamuna River, so as to ensure rapid transport of grains to Delhi. They were required to bring their families, cattle and goods to their new residences. A supervisor was appointed to oversee their operations.

According to Barani, because of these changes, the transporters brought so much grain to Delhi that no releases were required from the government-run granaries.

=== Ban on regrating ===
Alauddin banned regrating, the practice of buying goods at a lower price and selling them at a higher price. All the government officials in the Ganga-Yamuna Doab region were required to guarantee that they would not permit any regrating in their area of authority. If any regrating was discovered in a particular territory, the officials in-charge were answerable to the throne. The regrated grain was confiscated by the government, and the violator was severely punished.

According to Barani, such regulations made it impossible for a merchant, a peasant, a grocer or anyone else to sell even minute quantities of grains above the regulated price.

=== Ban on taking surplus grain home ===
Alauddin's administration allowed the cultivators to take limited quantity of grain from fields to their homes for personal consumption. Alauddin required his revenue officers to sign written agreements promising that they would take severe measures to ensure that the cultivators in the Doab region were unable to take the surplus grain to their houses for regrating. This would force the cultivators to sell the grain to the transporters at low prices.

Barani states that the cultivators were also given the option of taking the surplus grain to the market themselves, and selling it there for a profit, at the prices fixed by Alauddin. Firishta clarifies that the cultivators could sell the grain at the markets in the nearest town: they were not required to visit the central market in Delhi.

=== Daily reports ===
Alauddin sought daily reports about the grain market from three independent sources:

1. The market superintendent
2. The intelligence officers
3. The secret spies

The 16th-century chronicler Firishta states that although Alauddin was illiterate at the beginning of his reign, he gradually acquired the ability to read these reports, which included hastily scribbled notes written in Persian script. Any variance in the reports from the three sources resulted in punishment for the market superintendent. The officials were aware that Alauddin received reports from three different sources, and thus, found no opportunity to deviate from the market rules.

=== Rationing during drought ===
Even during the times of scarce rainfall, there was no increase in the grain prices during Alauddin's reign. When the rains failed, the grocers of every neighbourhood (mohalla) in Delhi were given a daily allowance of grain from the central market. The allowance was determined by the population of the neighbourhood. People were also allowed to purchase ½ mann of grain directly from the central market at one time. The allowance was higher for the landless nobles and other distinguished men, and varied on the number of their dependants.

Alauddin ordered his officers to maintain law and order in market during times of drought. If a stampede resulted in the death of a helpless citizen, the law required the superintendent in-charge of the market to be punished.

== Sera-i Adl ==
The Sera-i Adl (literally "Place of Justice") was an exclusive market in Delhi for manufactured and imported goods. The goods sold at Sera-i Adl included cloth, sugar, herbs, dry fruits, butter (including ghee) and lamp-oil.

=== Establishment ===
Alauddin established the Sera-i Adl on an extensive piece of unused land near the Green Palace (Koshak-i Sabz), on the inner side of the Badaun Gate. The market remained open from morning to the afternoon prayer. The Sultan ordered every specified commodity to be sold only at the Sera-i Adl at the prices fixed by his administration. Any violation of this regulation resulted in confiscation of the commodity, and punishment to the seller.

=== Price fixing ===
Alauddin's administration fixed the prices of the various commodities sold at Sera-i Adl. Although the control over prices of such goods was not vital for the state, Alauddin probably wanted to keep the nobles happy, or he may have feared that high prices of these goods may affect the prices of other goods. Barani gives the prices for some of these commodities as follows:

Commodity	Price	per
Silk - Khuzz-i Delhi	16 tankas	unspecified
Silk - Khuzz-i Konla	6 tankas	unspecified
Silk - Mashru shiri (fine)	3 tankas	unspecified
Silk - Shirin (fine)	5 tankas	unspecified
Silk - Shirin (medium)	3 tankas	unspecified
Silk - Shirin (coarse)	2 tankas	unspecified
Silk - Salahati (coarse)	2 tankas	unspecified
Cotton - Burd (fine) with red lining	6 jitals (seemingly a copyist's mistake)	unspecified
Cotton - Burd (coarse)	36 jitals	unspecified
Cotton - Astar-i Nagauri (red)	24 jitals	unspecified
Cotton - Astar (coarse)	12 jitals	unspecified
Cotton - Chadar	10 jitals	unspecified
Fine-woven cotton cloth	1 tanka	20 yards
Coarse-woven cotton cloth	1 tanka	40 yards
Crystallized sugar (misri)	2.5 jitals	1 sir
Coarse sugar	1.5 jitals	1 sir
Brown sugar	1 jital	3 sirs
Ghee	1 jital	1.5 sir
Sesame oil	1 jital	3 sirs

Barani does not provide prices of all the commodities, but states that they can be estimated from the above list. Firishta adds that 5 sirs of salt could be purchased for 1 jital.

=== Registration of merchants ===
Alauddin ordered all the merchants of his empire (not just Delhi), both Hindu and Muslim, to be registered with the Ministry of Commerce. Their businesses were regulated. The merchants of Delhi were required to sign a written agreement promising to bring the imported commodities to Sera-i Adl, and to sell them at the officially fixed rates. Barani states that these merchants brought such large quantities of goods to Sera-i Adl that the goods accumulated in Delhi and remained unsold.

=== Prevention of regrating ===
After Alauddin fixed the prices of cloth, several merchants would purchase costly cloth at Sera-i Adl in Delhi and sell it outside Delhi a higher rate. To avoid such regrating, Alauddin appointed the rich Multani merchants as officers of Sera-i Adl, and asked them to sell their goods directly to the public, in such a way that these goods did not fall into the hands of the other merchants. The Multani merchant-officers were given 2 million tankas from the treasury, possibly as a subsidy, or as an advance.

=== Permit for buying expensive fabrics ===
Alauddin ordered that certain expensive fabrics, which were deemed unnecessary for the general public, could be bought only with a permit. These permits had to be issued personally by specific state-appointed officers (Parwana Ra'is). The officers issued permits to amirs, maliks, and other important persons in accordance with their incomes. This ensured that people could not buy such fabrics at a cheap price in Delhi and sell it elsewhere at a higher price.

== Slave and animal market ==
=== Price-fixing ===
Alauddin also fixed the prices for slaves and animals. Barani gives the following prices for slaves:

Slave prices
Type of slave	Price
Female slave for domestic work	5-12 tankas
Female slave for concubinage	20-40 tankas
Handsome, young male slave	20-30 tankas
Slave experienced in work	10-15 tankas
Inexperienced young slave	7-8 tankas

Barani states that very few slaves were sold for 100-200 tankas: if an expensive slave, whose normal price would be 1,000-2,000 after Alauddin's death, appeared in the market, nobody would buy it because of the fear of Alauddin's spies.

The supply of horses in Delhi had improved as a result of Alauddin's conquest of Gujarat, which was an important hub for the Indian Ocean trade. However, only Alauddin's government was allowed to buy good quality horses, which were important for raising and maintaining an efficient army. Alauddin's administration fixed the prices for horses as follows, after consulting experienced brokers:

Horse prices
Type of horse	Price
Grade I	100-120 tankas
Grade II	80-90 tankas
Grade III	60-70 tankas
Small Indian pony (tattoo, not suitable for the cavalry)	10-25 tankas

Barani gives the following prices for other animals:

Prices for other animals
Animal	Price
Best-quality beast of burden	4-5 tankas
Male cattle for breeding purposes	3 tankas
Cows for meat	1.5-2 tankas
Cows for milk	3-4 tankas
Buffalo for meat	5-6 tankas
Buffalo for milk	10-12 tankas
Fat goat or sheep	10-12 jitals

Barani states that the best-quality beasts of burden, which cost 4 tankas (maximum 5 tankas) during Alauddin's reign, cost 30-40 tankas a few decades after his death.

=== Elimination of horse merchants ===
During Alauddin's reign, any man who wanted to join the cavalry had to appear for a review with a horse and equipment. The state would reimburse the cost of the horse, if the candidate passed the review and joined the army, and if his horse died or became useless during the service. However, the candidate was expected to pay for his horse before the review. Taking advantage of this situation, several wealthy people entered into the business of purchasing and rearing horses, and colluded with the brokers to raise prices.

As part of his market reforms, Alauddin ordered these horse merchants to be arrested and imprisoned in remote forts. Capitalist investors were banned from participating in the horse trade. Alauddin also eliminated the merchants from the markets for other animals and slaves.

Barani does not mention who sold slaves and animals after the merchants were arrested. The later writer Firishta clarifies that Alauddin imprisoned the merchants only temporarily: After the prices had stabilized, they were allowed to buy and sell horses on the condition that they would not violate Alauddin's price-fixing regulations.

=== Supervision of brokers ===
Alauddin's administration closely supervised the brokers participating in the slave and animal markets. The brokers were responsible for grading the goods and estimating their prices. Before Alauddin's reforms, the leading brokers would help the wealthy merchants raise the prices, and took commissions from both the merchants and the buyers. As part of his market reforms, Alauddin ordered the brokers to be screened carefully to prevent any price rises. The erring brokers were imprisoned with the merchants in remote forts.

=== Investigations ===
As the horses were required for Alauddin's army, he gave special attention to the horse trade. He ordered the leading horse brokers and their horses to be brought before him for a detailed investigation every forty days or two months. Barani states that the brokers were treated so harshly that they wanted to die. Alauddin also appointed spies to the slave and animal markets, and thoroughly analyzed their reports.

== General markets ==
According to Barani, Alauddin's Ministry of Commerce (diwan-i riyasat) dictated the prices of all the goods sold in the general markets spread across Delhi. These prices were determined by Alauddin and his staff according to the production cost of the goods. Barani mentions that Alauddin's price control measures were directed at all kinds of goods, "from caps to socks; from combs to needles; from vegetables, soups, sweetmeats to chapatis."

Alauddin selected Yaqub Nazir as his Minister of Commerce, and also appointed him as the censor, and the superintendent of weights and measures. Barani describes Yaqub Nazir as an honest but "rude and cruel" man. The Minister appointed a superintendent for every market to ensure that the shopkeepers adhered to the price list sanctioned by Alauddin's administration. The superintendents were also responsible for maintaining proper prices for the commodities that could not be included in the official price list.

Yaqub Nazir regularly checked the prices in the general markets, and meted out humiliating punishments to the erring shopkeepers. These punishments scared the shopkeepers into reducing their prices. However, the shopkeepers used other methods to make illegal profits, including use of false weights, sale of low-quality commodities, and lying to young and ignorant customers. To address this problem, Alauddin started sending child employees of the royal pigeon-house to make test purchases, which would be reviewed by Yaqub Nazir. Barani states that if a shopkeeper did not give full weight to the child customer, the Minister would carve out double the due weight of flesh from the shopkeeper's body. Such severe punishments finally ensured adherence to Alauddin's price-fixing regulations in the general markets.

== Extent of implementation ==
Barani states that Alauddin's market reforms (such as price control) were implemented in the city of Delhi, the capital of the empire. He states that the regulations implemented in Delhi tended to be followed in other towns, but does not explicitly state if this was the case with Alauddin's reforms. The later writer Firishta suggests that the price control regulations were implemented in the territories other than Delhi as well.

== Impact ==
Alauddin's reforms allowed him to raise a powerful army, which decisively defeated the Mongols.

Alauddin's courtier Amir Khusrau greatly praises his reforms, portraying them as public welfare measures. He states that the low fixed prices of grains and supply from the royal granaries benefited the public during the times of scarce rainfall. According to an anecdote mentioned by the 14th century writer Hamid Qalandar, even after the Sultan's death, people respected Alauddin for reducing and fixing the price of grains: they made pilgrimages to his tomb to have their prayers fulfilled.

The cheap prices enabled the general public to indulge in frequent entertainment activities. Hamid Qalandar, who wrote during the early reign of Firuz Shah Tughluq (r. 1351–1388), quotes Nasiruddin Chiragh Dehlavi as follows:

In those days entertainments were common. During the days of the pilgrimages and on the last Wednesday of the month of Safar it was difficult to find (sitting) accommodation in the public enclosures, in the public gardens or by the side of the tanks. There was music and dancing on every side. These feasts would cost a tanka or more.

According to Nasiruddin, even beggars could afford cotton-stuffed garments during Alauddin's reign. In fact, an officer called Kafur Muhrdar would distribute such garments among the poor.

According to historian Banarsi Prasad Saksena, the contemporary Muslims had limited participation in the business because of Islamic restrictions (see riba). Alauddin's reforms must have caused "discomforts" to the two leading Hindu mercantile communities: the Nayakas (who traded grains) and the Multanis (who traded cloth). Saksena believes that these discomforts were compensated by guaranteed profits resulting from Alauddin's price fixing.

== Revocation ==
Alauddin's market reforms ended a few months after his death, when they were revoked by his son Qutbuddin Mubarak Shah. This led to an increase in prices, and consequently, wages. Mubarak Shah also released a large number of prisoners that Alauddin's administration had arrested for various reasons.
