= Khusrau Khan =

Sultan of Delhi in 1320

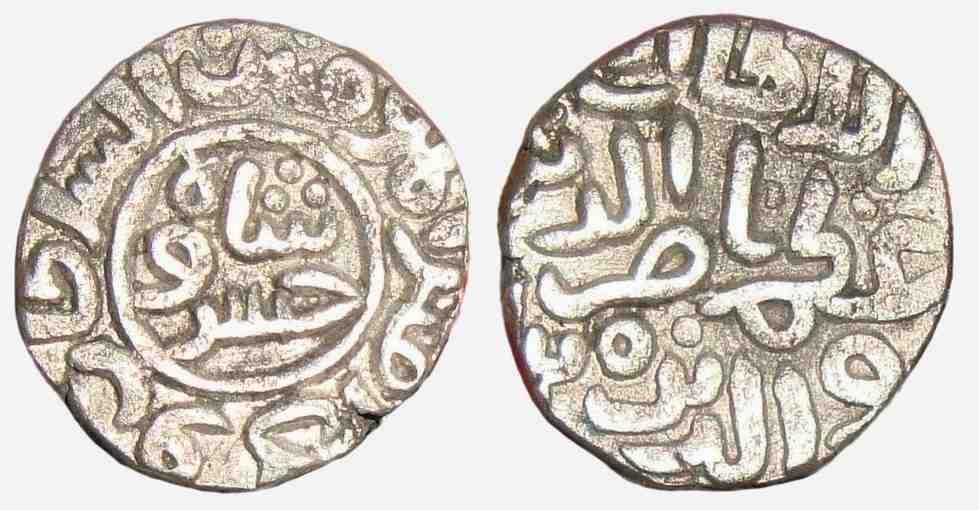
- Billon two Gani coin of Khusrau Shah, c. 1320

16th Sultan of Delhi
- Reign: 10 July – 6 September 1320
- Predecessor: Qutbuddin Mubarak Shah
- Successor: Ghiyath al-Din Tughluq
- Born: Late 13th-century Veraval, Chudasama Kingdom (modern-day Gujarat, India)
- Died: 1320; Delhi, Delhi Sultanate (modern-day New Delhi, India)
- Spouse: Devala Devi (m. 1320)
Regnal name
- Al-Sultān al-Āzam Nāsir al-Dunyā wa'l Dīn Khusrau Shāh al-Sultān Walī Amīr al-Mu'minīn (Note: السلطان الاعظم ناصر الدنیا وال دین خسرو شاہ السلطان ولی امیر المومنین (lit. 'The Great Sultan, Helper of the World and the Faith, Khusrau Shah, the Sultan, Guardian of the Commander of the Faithful'))
- Religion: Sunni Islam (Note: May have reverted to Hinduism later)

Nasir ud-Din Khusrau Shah (Persian: ناصر الدین خسرو شاہ), better known as Khusrau Khan, was the sixteenth Sultan of Delhi for around two months in 1320. Originally from the Gujarat region, he was captured by the Delhi army during Alauddin Khalji's conquest of Malwa in 1305. After being brought to Delhi as a slave, he converted to Islam. After ascending the throne in 1316, Mubarak Shah gave him the title Khusrau Khan, and greatly favoured him.

Khusrau Khan led a successful campaign to reassert Delhi's control over Devagiri in 1317. The next year, he led an army that besieged Warangal, forcing the Kakatiya ruler Prataparudra to resume tribute payments to Delhi. In 1320, he led a group of Baradus and disgruntled nobles to assassinate Mubarak Shah, and ascended the throne with the regnal name Nasir ud-Din. However, he was soon deposed by a group of rebels led by the noble Ghazi Malik, who succeeded him on the throne.

== Early life ==
According to the Delhi chronicler Amir Khusrau, Khusrau Khan and his brother belonged to a Hindu military caste or group called Baradu. The name of this group has been variously transliterated as Barau, Barvari or Parvar. Some writers have identified this group as Bharwad, that is, shepherd. The Baradus were nominally converts to Islam, but retained some affiliations with Hinduism. In 1305, during the reign of Alauddin Khalji, they were captured when the Delhi forces led by Ayn al-Mulk Multani conquered Malwa in central India. They were brought as slaves to Delhi, where they converted to Islam, and were named Hasan (later Khusrau Khan) and Husamuddin (or Hisamuddin). They were brought up by Alauddin's naib-i khas-i hajib Malik Shadi.

The two brothers acted as passive homosexuals to maintain their status and position. Alauddin's son Mubarak Shah fell in love with Hasan: he preferred Hasan as a homosexual partner, but turned to Husamuddin whenever Hasan was unavailable. Their relationship was not a secret, and Mubarak and Hasan exchanged hugs and kisses in public.

After Alauddin's death in 1316, his slave-general Malik Kafur appointed the minor prince Shihabuddin Omar as a puppet ruler. Shortly after, Malik Kafur was killed, and Shihabuddin's half brother Mubarak Shah usurped the throne. Mubarak Shah gave Hasan the title Khusrau Khan, with the former fief of Malik Kafur. Within a year, Khusrau Khan was promoted to the post of vazir. According to the chronicler Barani, Mubarak Shah became "so enamored by Hasan ... that he did not want to be parted from him for a moment." Mubarak Shah appointed Khusrau Khan's brother Husamuddin as the governor of Gujarat. Husamuddin later became an apostate (from Islam), because of which the local nobles of Gujarat arrested him, and brought him to Delhi in chains. However, Mubarak Shah merely slapped him, and gave him a high position in the royal court.

== Military career under Mubarak Shah ==
The Yadavas of Devagiri, who had become tributaries to Delhi during Alauddin's reign, asserted their independence after Malik Kafur's death. After consolidating his rule in Delhi, Mubarak Shah led a campaign to Devagiri in 1317, forcing the Yadava leader Harapala-deva and his prime minister Raghava to flee. Khusrau Khan, along with Malik Qutlugh, led an army to pursue them. The Delhi forces completely routed Raghava's army. Khusrau Khan then dispatched a force led by Malik Ikhtiyaruddin Talbagha to pursue Harapaladeva, who was later captured and beheaded.

Another tributary, the Kakatiya ruler Prataparudra, stopped making tribute payments to Delhi after Alauddin's death. In 1318, Mubarak Shah sent an army led by Khusrau Khan, Malik Qutlugh, and Khwaja Haji to besieged Warangal, the capital of Prataparudra. Prataparudra surrendered, and agreed to make regular tribute payments. After this victory, Khusrau Khan marched to Ellora, where Mubarak Shah had been residing for a month. The rest of the army joined him on the banks of the Narmada River on his way back to Delhi.

== Assassination of Mubarak Shah ==
Chronicler Ziauddin Barani writes that Khusrau Khan resented "the way the Sultan forced himself upon him and took advantage of him", and secretly planned revenge against him. Mubarak's other subordinates warned him about Khusrau's treacherous plans, but while being sodomized by the Sultan, Khusrau convinced him that the accusers were falsely slandering him.

Khusrau Khan also convinced Mubarak Shah to allow him to raise an army of Baradu Hindus by arguing that all other nobles (maliks) had their own groups of followers. He enlisted several soldiers at Bahilwal (near Mount Abu) and in the province of Gujarat. According to Tughluq Nama, this army included 10,000 Baradu horsemen, and was commanded by several Hindu chiefs (rais and ranas).

Next, Khusrau Khan contacted officers who resented Sultan Mubarak Shah, and conspired with them to kill the Sultan in the royal palace. He told the Sultan that he wanted his men to be granted access to the palace, so that they could meet him without requiring him to leave the Sultan's company. The Sultan obliged, and subsequently, every night 300-400 Baradus started entering the palace. They assembled in the former chambers of Malik Kafur on the ground floor of the palace, which had been assigned to Khusrau Khan.

On 7 May 1320, Qazi Ziyauddin, a teacher of the Sultan, suggested an investigation into the assembly of the Baradus. However, the Sultan angrily dismissed the suggestion, and none of the nobles dared to make a similar suggestion. Barani claims that, when the Sultan told Khusrau Khan about Qazi Ziyauddin's suggestion, Khusrau Khan won over his confidence by making love with him.

On the night of 9 July 1320, Qazi Ziyauddin visited the ground floor of the palace to supervise the palace guard. Randhol, the maternal uncle of Khusrau Khan, entered the palace with a large number of Baradus, who hid daggers under their clothes. When Ziyauddin let his guard down to accept a paan (betel leaf preparation) from Randhol, the Baradu leader Jaharya stabbed him to death. The Sultan, who was in the company of Khusrau Khan on the upper floor, heard the commotion caused by Ziyauddin's murder. However, Khusrau Khan told him that the royal horses had broken loose, and the noise was caused by the guards trying to catch the animals. Meanwhile, Jaharya and other Baradus entered the upper floor, and killed the Sultan's special guards - Ibrahim and Ishaq. The Sultan now realized that a rebellion was happening against him, and tried to escape to his harem, which was located a floor above. However, Khusrau Khan stopped him by seizing his hair. The Sultan knocked Khusrau Khan to the ground, and sat on his chest, but Khusrau Khan did not let go of his hair. Meanwhile, Jaharya arrived at the scene, stuck a patta (axe) at the Sultan's chest, lifted him up by his hair, and threw him to the ground. He then beheaded the Sultan, and the head was later thrown in the courtyard on the ground floor. The Baradus massacred the palace residents, while the royal guards fled to save their lives.

To eliminate any possible claimants to the thorne, the Baradus then entered the royal harem. They asked for the surviving sons of Alauddin to be produced before them, declaring that they intended to install one of the princes on the throne, and the others as provincial governors. The mothers of the princes did not believe the Baradus, and tried to hide them. However, the Baradus found the princes, and killed the eldest among them – Farid Khan (fifteen years old) and Abu Bakr Khan (fourteen years old) – after allowing them to say their final prayers. They also killed Mubarak Shah's mother Jhatyapali. They blinded three other sons of Alauddin - Bahauddin Khan (eight years old), Ali Khan (eight years old), and Usman Khan (five years old); these princes were imprisoned at the Red Palace (Qasr-i Lal). According to the 16th century writer Firishta, even Malik Nusrat – who had renounced royal life to become a dervish – was killed, because he was the nephew ( son of a sister ) of Alauddin.

== Reign ==
=== Accession ===
Khusrau Khan initially planned to install a son of the deceased Sultan on the throne as a puppet ruler. However, his advisors suggested that a prince would have him killed after his accession, and therefore, he decided to claim the throne himself.

After killing the Sultan and potential claimants to the throne, the conspirators persuaded or compelled the various nobles to come to the first floor of the royal palace at midnight, and accept Khusrau Khan as the new king. According to Barani, the following nobles were held as "hostages" at midnight: Ayn al-Mulk Multani, Wahiduddin Quraishi, Bahauddin Dabir, and three sons of Malik Qara Beg. No information is available about the discussions between the conspirators and the nobles, but by the sunrise, all the nobles at the palace had accepted Khusrau Khan's accession to the throne as Sultan Nasiruddin.

Shortly after ascending the throne, Khusrau Khan married the widow of Mubarak Shah. This marriage was declared invalid after Khusrau Khan was deposed, as according to the Muslim law, the widow could remarry only when four menstruation periods had passed after her husband's death.

=== Administration ===
Khusrau Khan's officers included the following men, many of whom had served Alauddin:

- Tajul Mulk Malik Wahiduddin Quraishi was re-appointed as the wazir; he died or retired soon after, when the post of wazir was given to Ayn al-Mulk Multani
- Malik Ayn al-Mulk Multani was given the title Alimul mulk
- Malik Hasan, Malik Hussain, and Malik Badruddin Abu Bakr – the sons of Malik Qara Beg – were given the offices of their father.
- Malik Fakhruddin Jauna, a son of Tughluq, was given the office of akhur-bek
- Shaista Khan, a co-conspirator and a son of Muhammad Qirat Qimar, was appointed the minister of war
- Yusuf Sahi, another co-conspirator, was given the title of Sufi Khan and appointed as a counseller
- Malik Tamar was appointed as the governor of Chanderi
- Kamaluddin Sufi
- Kafur Muhrdar was given the post of amir-i hajib
- Shihab was given the post of naib-i amir-i hajib
- Tigin was appointed as the governor of Awadh
- Bahauddin Dabir was given the title Azam-ul Mulk, and re-appointed as the minister of the secretariat, a post that he held during Alauddin's reign
- Sumbul Hatim Khan
- Malik Yak Lakkhi Qadr Khan (not to be confused with Yak Lakkhi, the governor of Devagiri and Samana)
- Ambar Bughra Khan
- Talbagha, son of Yaghda
- Talbagha Nagauri
- Saif Chaush
- Malik Qabul, who had been given the post of shuhna-i manda by Alauddin
- Ahmad Ayaz, the kotwal of Siri, and his son Muhammad Ayaz

The Baradus do not appear to have been granted any important posts in Khusrau Khan's government, presumably because they were illiterate. However, several of them appear to have been rewarded with titles, cash grants, and military commands. For example:

- Husamuddin, the younger brother of Khusrau Khan, was given the title Khan-i Khanan
- Randhol, an uncle of Khusrau Khan, was given the title Rai Rayan; he was also given the house and wealth of Qazi Ziyauddin
- Two other uncles of the new Sultan – probably Nag and Kajb Brahma – were given the highest commands in the Baradu contingent
- Jaharya, the murderer of the preceding sultan, was given pearls and diamonds

=== Religious outlook ===
Khusro Khan, along with Malik Kafur, had led numerous military campaigns on behalf of Alauddin Khalji, to expand the Sultanate and plunder non-Muslim kingdoms in India.

Barani portrays the killing of Mubarak Shah as a Hindu-Muslim conflict. He claims that 5–6 days after Khusrau Khan's ascension to the throne, the Baradus and other Hindus started idol worship in the palace, and would sit on the Quran. The Baradus obtained control of the houses of the former Muslim nobles, along with their women and slave-girls. The Hindus rejoiced at Khusrau Khan's ascension, hoping to weaken the Muslims, and make Delhi a Hindu-majority city again. Additionally, Khusrau’s prohibition of cow slaughter alienated many Muslim nobles, who after just four months transferred their loyalty to Ghiyath al-Din Tughluq, a popular and experienced commander who had repulsed several Mongol invasions in the Punjab.

Pakistani-Canadian academic Aziz Ahmad writes that after usurping the kingdom, Khusrau Khan "reverted to his ancient faith, began a reign of terror heaping dishonour on Muslim nobles".

According to Indian historian Mohammad Habib, Barani's narrative is unreliable, and contradicted by more reliable sources. Khusrau Khan wished to be seen as a normal Muslim monarch, and had the khutba in the mosques read in his name. Apart from Qazi Ziyauddin, whose wife and child had run away after his killing, the Baradus did not seize houses of Muslim nobles, many of whom were appointed to regular government posts under Khusrau.

Historian Kishori Saran Lal also challenged the traditional portrayal of Khusrau Khan’s reign. In his article “Sultan Nasir al-Din Khusrau Shah (1320 A.D.),” Lal argued that Barani’s assertion that Khusrau attempted to establish a Hindu kingdom was “wholly incorrect.” He noted that Khusrau continued to use Islamic royal titles, had the khutba proclaimed in his name in mosques, and issued coins bearing his name. Lal further observed that Khusrau had fought Hindu rulers during his Deccan campaigns and destroyed Hindu temples, while Amir Khusrau described the humiliations inflicted upon the ruler of Telangana during these campaigns. Lal also cited Ibn Battuta’s account that Khusrau had many Parvaris converted to Islam. On this basis, Lal argued that the available evidence did not support the claim that Khusrau’s reign represented an attempt to restore Hindu rule or that he was hostile to Muslims on religious grounds

== Overthrow ==
Ghazi Malik (Ghiyath al-Din Tughluq), the governor of Dipalpur refused to acknowledge Khusrau Khan's ascension. However, realizing the enemy's military strength, he did not take any immediate steps to oppose the ascension. Tughluq's son Fakhruddin Jauna, who held the office of akhur-bek in Khusrau Khan's government, was not happy with the regime at Delhi. He convened a secret meeting of his friends, and on their advice, sought help from his father to overthrow Khusrau Khan.

On the advice of his father, Fakhruddin Jauna left Delhi with some companions. When Khusrau Khan learned of the conspiracy, he dispatched his minister of war Shaista Khan in pursuit of Fakhruddin, but the royal army was unable to capture the rebels. Tughluq then sought support from five neighbouring governors:

- Bahram, the governor of Uchch, joined Tughluq's cause and provided military support.
- Mughlati, the governor of Multan, refused to join Tughluq, and was killed by Tughluq's friend Bahram Siraj. His army did not join Tughluq's forces.
- Malik Yak Lakkhi, the governor of Samana, informed Khusrau Khan about Tughluq's letter, and unsuccessfully invaded Dipalpur. He later retreated to Samana, and was killed by a group of angry citizens.
- Muhammad Shah Lur, the governor of Sindh, agreed to support Tughluq, but reached Delhi only after Tughluq ascended the throne.
- Hushang Shah, the governor of Jalor, also promised to support Tughluq, but deliberately reached Delhi only after the battle between the forces of Tughluq and Khusrau Khan was over.

Tughluq also sent a letter to Khusrau Khan's wazir (prime minister) Ayn al-Mulk Multani. Multani was surrounded by Khusrau Khan's men when he received the letter, so he took the letter to the Sultan and expressed his loyalty. However, when Tughuq sent a second message to him, he expressed sympathy with Tughluq's cause, although refused to directly support Tughluq because he was surrounded by Khusrau Khan's allies.

As Tughluq raised a bigger army, and gained more support, Khusrau Khan's counselors advised him to take steps to prevent any further conspiracies and eliminate potential claimants to the throne. Accordingly, Khusrau Khan ordered killings of Alauddin's three sons – Bahauddin, Ali, and Usman – who had earlier been blinded and imprisoned.

Tughluq's army defeated Khusrau Khan's forces at the Battle of Saraswati and the Battle of Lahrawat. Khusrau Khan fled from the battlefield, but was captured and killed a few days later.

According to Amir Khusrau, Mubarak Shah was murdered on 9 July 1320 and Tughluq ascended the throne on 6 September 1320. This implies that Khusrau Khan held the throne for less than two months. However, 14th century chronicler Isami states that Khusrau Khan reigned for "two or three" months. Barani also suggests that Khusrau Khan ruled for more than two months, when he states that Fakhruddin Jauna fled from Delhi 2½ months after the Sultan's ascension.
