= Mongol invasion of India (1303) =

Major battle of Chagatai Khanate

Siege of Delhi 1303
- Part of the Mongol invasions of India
Date	October 1303
Location	Delhi 28.6545622°N 77.2308955°E
Result	Delhi Sultanate victory

Belligerents
Chagatai Khanate	Delhi Sultanate

Commanders and leaders
(Chagatai Khanate) Taraghai	(Delhi Sultanate) Alauddin Khalji

Strength
30,000–40,000 (according to Ziauddin Barani)	Unknown
- Location of Delhi in present-day India

In 1303, a Mongol army of the Chagatai Khanate launched an invasion of the Delhi Sultanate coinciding with two major units of the Delhi army being away from the city. The Sultan of Delhi, Alauddin Khalji, who was at Chittor when the Mongols embarked on their march, returned to Delhi in a hurry. However, he was unable to make adequate war preparations, and decided to take shelter in a well-guarded camp at Siri Fort, which was then undergoing development and construction. The Mongols, led by Taraghai, besieged Delhi for over two months, and ransacked its suburbs. Ultimately, they decided to retreat, having been unable to breach Alauddin's camp.

The invasion was one of the most serious Mongol invasions of India, and prompted Alauddin to take several measures to prevent a recurrence. He strengthened military presence along the Mongol routes to India and implemented economic reforms to ensure adequate revenue streams for maintaining a strong army.

== Background ==
Alauddin Khalji, the ruler of the Delhi Sultanate, had successfully warded off Mongol invasions from the Chagatai Khanate and its neighbours in 1297-98, 1298-99 and 1299. In the winter of 1302–1303, Alauddin dispatched an army to ransack Warangal, while he himself led another army to conquer Chittor. When the Mongols learned that two large units of the imperial army were absent from Delhi, they decided to capture the city. The Mongol army was led by Taraghai (also Turghai; sometimes incorrectly transliterated as "Targhi"). Taraghai had earlier served as a general in the 1299 invasion led by Qutlugh Khwaja.

According to the 14th century chronicler Ziauddin Barani, the Mongol army comprised "30,000 or 40,000" horsemen. Some manuscripts of Barani's writings give the number as "20,000 or 30,000". The Mongols marched through Punjab without meeting much resistance. The Delhi Sultanate forces stationed at Multan, Dipalpur, and Samana were not strong enough to check the Mongol advance, or to proceed to Delhi and help Alauddin.

Meanwhile, Alauddin captured Chittor in August 1303, and appointed his own governor there. He left Chittor 7 days after the conquest, probably when he learned about the Mongol plans.

== Alauddin's preparations ==
Alauddin reached Delhi around a month before the Mongols did, but he was unable to make adequate preparations for the impending battle. The weapons of his army had been ruined in the rainy season, during the Siege of Chittor. He had also been unable to replace the horses and the materials that his army had lost in Chittor.

Alauddin sent messages to his provincial governors, ordering them to send reinforcements to Delhi. However, the Mongols had set up blockades on all the roads leading to Delhi. The merchant caravans were also forced to stop, leading to a scarcity of goods in Delhi.

The army that Alauddin had sent to capture Warangal had abandoned its mission, and had reached close to Delhi after a long journey. But it had lost several men and material in the process. Moreover, it could not enter Delhi, because by this time, the Mongols had captured the fords of the Yamuna River. Despite Alauddin's summons to come to Delhi, this army was forced to halt at Koil (Aligarh) and Bulandshahr, located south-east of Delhi.

Given these difficult circumstances, Alauddin decided to avoid a personal confrontation with the Mongols. He exited the fortified city of Delhi, and set up his royal camp at the under-construction Siri. On three sides, Siri was surrounded by the Yamuna River, a dense jungle, and the old citadel of Delhi: it was vulnerable only at its north side. Alauddin ordered a ditch to be dug around his Siri camp. The ditch, in turn, was protected by a wooden rampart built from the doors of Delhi's houses. This temporary settlement was guarded by several contingents of armed soldiers, with each contingent having five fully armed elephants in its front.

== Mongol invasion of Delhi ==
The Mongols faced the vanguard of the Delhi army two or three times. Neither side achieved a decisive victory in these conflicts, and the Mongols were unable to enter Alauddin's Siri camp.

Although repulsed from Siri, the Mongols proceeded to other parts of the present-day Delhi. Barani names these parts as Chautara-i Subhani, Mori, Hudhudi and the royal tank (Hauz-i Sultani). The modern identity of these areas is not certain; Hauz-i Sultani probably refers to Hauz-i-Shamsi. The Mongols also ransacked the royal stores, and sold corn and other commodities from it to the public at a cheap rate.

The invaders spent two months in and around Delhi, but were unable to breach Alauddin's Siri camp. Taraghai realized that further stay in hostile territory would put his army in a precarious situation. Therefore, he decided to return with the plunder he had gathered until that point. Taraghai's return might have also been influenced by the conflict between Duwa and Chapar in his home country. A later fabrication claims that Taraghai retreated as a result of the prayers of the Sufi saint Nizamuddin Auliya.

Ziauddin Barani, who was a resident of Delhi at that time, later wrote that the city had never witnessed such fear of Mongols. According to him, if Taraghai had decided to stay in Delhi for another month, the city would have fallen to him.

== Aftermath ==
Before the Mongol invasion of 1303, Alauddin had personally led many expeditions and sieges. However, Taraghai's near-conquest of Delhi made him more careful. Subsequently, nearly all his campaigns (with the exception of Siwana) were led by his generals (such as Malik Kafur). Alauddin himself stayed at Siri, where he built a palace. Siri (then a town outside the fortified city of Delhi) thus became the capital of the Delhi Sultanate, and its population increased rapidly. Alauddin also had the old fort wall of Delhi repaired.

To weaken the Mongol threat, Alauddin strengthened the military presence along the Mongol routes to India. He had several old forts repaired and new ones built along this route. Powerful kotwals (fort commanders) with an increased number of soldiers were assigned to these forts. The armouries and stores of these forts were replenished. A large army was deployed at Dipalpur and Samana. Besides, the iqta's on the Mongol frontier were assigned to efficient and experienced noblemen and army officers.

Alauddin also implemented a series of economic reforms. Barani suggests that his main objective was to ensure sufficient revenue inflows for the maintenance of a strong army to deal with the Mongol threat.

These measures did not prevent the Mongols from invading India, but ensured that the invaders were decisively defeated in their further attempts to invade Alauddin's territory.
