= Ayn al-Mulk Multani =

General of Delhi Sultanate

- Allegiance: Delhi Sultanate
- Branch: Khalji dynasty Tughlaq dynasty
- Service years: c. 1296–c. 1325
- Conflicts: Alauddin Khalji's conquest of Malwa (1305)

‘Ayn al-Mulk Mūltānī was a military commander and official who served the Khalji and Tughluq dynasties of the Delhi Sultanate in present-day India. He served as Alauddin Khalji's governor of Malwa and Devagiri, and after Alauddin's death, suppressed a revolt in Gujarat.

== Early life ==
'Ayn al-Mulk Multānī belonged to a Punjabi community of traders known as Multanis, who controlled long-distance trade during the era of Delhi Sultanate. His actual name is unknown: "`Ayn Al-Mulk" is a title (also transliterated as `Ain ul-Mulk), while Multani is a nisba indicating that he hailed from the city of Multan. The 15th century chronicler Yahya bin Ahmad Sirhindi calls him "`Ayn Al-Mulk-i Shihab", which suggests that his father's name was Shihab.

== Career ==
=== In Alauddin's service ===
Multānī started his career during the reign of Sultan ‘Ala’ al-Dīn Khaljī (r. 1296–1316), as a secretary (dabir) to ‘Ala’ al-Dīn's brother Ulugh Khan. According to Alauddin's courtier Amir Khusrau, he was a learned statesman and a veteran military general. The later chronicler Ziauddin Barani describes him as a widely-travelled well-experienced man, who was known for his wise counsel and his ability to tackle complex problems. Barani also mentions that, like Khusrau, he was skilled with both the sword and the pen.

In 1304-05 (704 AH), ‘Ala’ al-Dīn Khaljī sent an army to Malwa, likely headed by Mūltānī who was subsequently appointed governor of the province. Multani played an important role in consolidating Alauddin's rule in Malwa. He forced the Paramara vassals of Ujjain, Dhar, and Chanderi to acknowledge Alauddin's suzerainty. Subsequently, he invaded Mandu, where the Paramara king Mahalakadeva had taken shelter. His army defeated the Paramaras, and killed Mahalakadeva and his son.

When the Devagiri governor Malik Kafur was recalled to Delhi as the viceroy during Alauddin's sickness, Multani was made the governor of Devagiri.

=== In Mubarak Shah's service ===
After Alauddin's death, Kafur asked Multani to come to Delhi, but while he was en route, Kafur directed him to Gujarat. Kafur had executed Alp Khan, the governor of Gujarat, leading to a revolt in the province, and another general Kamal al-Din Gurg had been killed while trying to suppress the revolt. While Multani was on the way to Gujarat, Kafur was killed and Alauddin's son Qutb ud din Mubarak Shah (r. 1316–1320) seized the throne of Delhi. As a result, the nobles accompanying Multani refused to proceed further, and his entourage had to halt at Chittor. After a few days, Mubarak Shah ordered them to proceed to Gujarat and end the rebellion, and Multani resumed his march.

In Gujarat, Multani tried to resolve the situation diplomatically. He wrote letters to the rebel leaders, pointing out that Alp Khan's murder had been avenged with Kafur's murder. He asked them to end the rebellion, and warned them of serious consequences if they refused to do so. Most of the rebels agreed to join his camp. Two of the rebels -- Haydar and Zirak -- refused to oblige, and were easily defeated. Multani returned to Delhi after establishing peace and order in Gujarat.

In 1318, the Devagiri governor Yak Lakhi staged a rebellion, and Multani was sent to subjugate him. Around this time, he was appointed as the wazir.

=== In Khusrau Khan's service ===
After Mubarak Shah was killed in 1320, the new Sultan Khusrau Khan r. 1320– honoured Multani with the title "Alam Khan" to win him over. Subsequently, Ghazi Malik Tughluq, the muqta of Depalpur, tried to persuade Multani and other nobles to rebel against Khusrau Khan and avenge Mubarak Shah's death. When Multani received Tughluq's letter, he was concerned about the presence of Khusrau Khan's agents. Therefore, he took the letter to Khusrau Khan and assured the Sultan of his loyalty. However, when Tughuq wrote a second letter to him, he expressed sympathy with Tughluq's cause. Multani stated that he was surrounded by Khusrau's allies, and therefore, would not take sides in the upcoming battle.

=== In Tughluq's service ===
Ghazi Malik Tughluq killed Khusrau after a battle, and ascended the throne of Delhi with the title "Ghiyath al-Din" (r. 1320–1325). He appears to have retained Multani in the royal service.

According to the chronicler Isami, Multani joined Ulugh Khan (who later ascended the throne of Delhi as Muhammad bin Tughluq, r. 1325–1351) on the 1322 expedition to Warangal. Several of Ulugh Khan's officers revolted against him during the prolonged siege, but Multani remained loyal to him.

No information about Multani's later life is available. Some medieval chronicles attempt to provide such information, but they have confused Multani with another noble `Ayn al-Mulk Mahru (called `Ayn al-Din by Isami). Isami and Barani clearly distinguish between the two men.
