= Ghiyath al-Din Tughluq =

Sultan of Delhi from 1320 to 1325

- Sultan of Delhi; Ghazi Malik; Sultan-e-Dilli
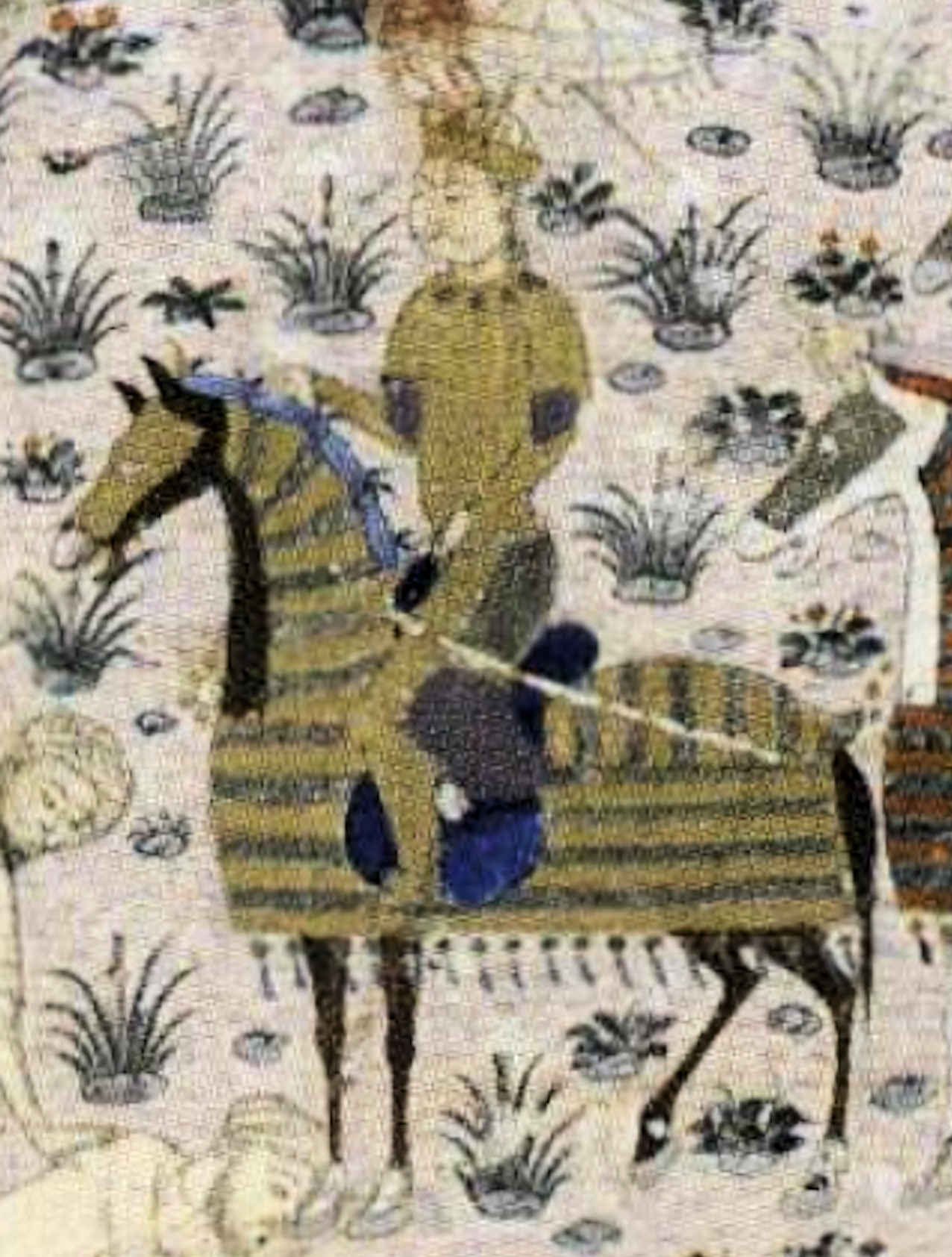
- A Jalayirid copy of a Delhi Sultanate manuscript, depicting ruler Ghiyath al-Din Tughluq leading his troops in the capture of the city of Tirhut, based on the Basātin al-uns by Muhammad Sadr Ala-i, a member of the Tughluq court and an ambassador to Ilkhanid Iran. Ca.1410 copy of 1326 original. Istanbul, Topkapi Palace Museum Library, Ms. R.1032.

17th Sultan of Delhi Tughluq Emperor
- Reign: 6 September 1320 – 1 February 1325
- Coronation: 6 September 1320
- Predecessor: Khusro Khan
- Successor: Muhammad bin Tughluq
- Died: 1 February 1325; Kara-Manikpur, India
- Burial: Tughlaqabad Fort, Delhi, India
- Spouse: Makhduma-i-Jahan; A daughter of Alauddin Khalji
- Issue: Muhammad bin Tughluq; Mahmud Khan; Mubarak Khan; Mas'ud Khan; Firuz Khunda; Khudawandzada Begum; Wife of Amir Bakht Sharaf ul Mulk; Wife of Malik ul Hukumah; Wife of Mughis Ibn Malik-il-Muluk; Wife of Imad-ud-Din Simnan; Wife of Ibn-Malik ul Ulama; Wife of Ibn Sadr-i-Jahan of Bukhara
Regnal name
- Al-Sultān al-Ghāzī Ghiyāth al-Dunyā wa'l Dīn al-Mutawakkil 'ala Allāh Abu'l Muzaffar Tug͟hluq Shāh al-Sultān Nāsir Amīr al-Mu'minīn (Note: السلطان الغازی غیاث الدنیا وال دین المتوکل علی اللہ ابو المظفر تغلق شاہ السلطان ناصر امیر المومنین (lit. 'The Warrior Sultan, Helper of the World and the Faith, the One Who Relies Upon Allah, Father of the Victorious, Tughluq Shah, the Sultan, Helper of the Commander of the Faithful'))
- House: Tughluq
- Religion: Sunni Islam

Ghiyath al-Din Tughluq Shah (Persian: غیاث الدین تغلق شاہ), also known as Ghazi Malik (Note: Ghazi means fighter for Islam;) (غازی ملک; died 1 February 1325), was the Sultan of Delhi from 1320 to 1325. He was the first sultan of the Tughluq dynasty of the Delhi Sultanate. During his reign, Ghiyath al-Din Tughluq founded the city of Tughluqabad. His reign ended upon his death in 1325 when a pavilion built in his honour collapsed. The 14th-century historian Ibn Battuta claimed that the death of the sultan was the result of a conspiracy against him.

Ghiyath al-Din Tughluq was succeeded by his eldest son, Muhammad bin Tughluq.

== Early life ==
Tughluq belonged to the Qara’unas, a Mongol tribe from Central Asia. His ancestry is widely discussed in the sources, which differ in detail but not in substance. Contemporary and later authors such as Ibn Battuta and Shams-i Siraj Afif describe him in broader terms as a Turk or Mongol. Several sources indicate that his family had become established in Hindustan: his father served under Balban, and his mother belonged to the Hindu Jat community of the Punjab. Firishta thus portrays him to have a mixed Turk–Jat lineage.

Literary, numismatic and epigraphic evidence makes it clear that Tughluq was the Sultan's personal name, and not a dynastic name. Another courtier Amir Khusrau, in his Tughluq Nama, states that Tughluq described himself as an unimportant man ("awara mard") in his early career. The Tughlaq Nama declares Tughlaq to have been a minor chief of humble origins.

Tughlaq began his career as a menial servant in the service of a merchant where he served as a keeper of horses or cattle driver before entering Khalji service.

== In Khalji service ==
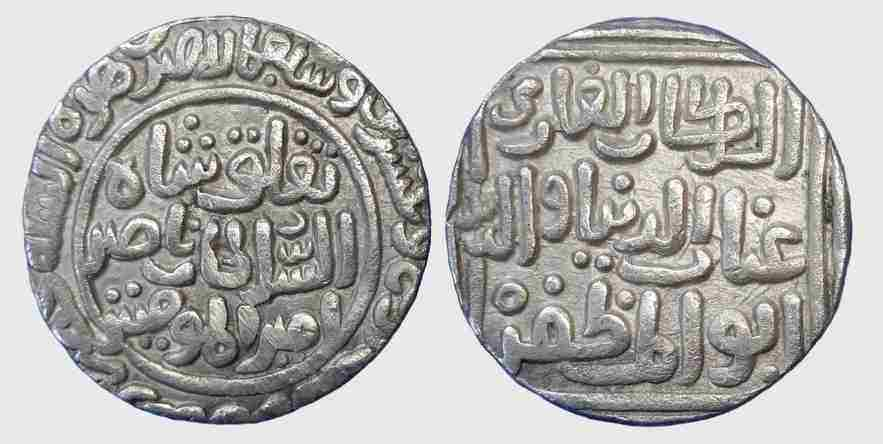
Silver Tanka of Ghiyath al-Din Tughluq Dated AH 724

According to Khusrau's Tughluq Nama, Tughluq spent a considerable time searching for a job in Delhi, before he joined the imperial guard of Jalaluddin Khalji. Khusrau states that Tughluq first distinguished himself in the early 1290s, during the Siege of Ranthambore, in which the Khalji forces were led by Ulugh Khan. Khusrau suggests that Tughluq was reduced to obscurity for a brief period after Jalaluddin was killed by his nephew Alauddin Khalji. This probably happened because, unlike many other nobles, Tughluq did not quickly change his loyalty to Alauddin.

Nevertheless, it was during Alauddin's reign that Tughluq rose to prominence. He entered the Khalji service as a personal attendant of Alauddin's brother Ulugh Khan. At the Battle of Amroha (1305), in which the Khalji army defeated a Mongol force from the Chagatai Khanate, Tughluq was among the chief subordinates of the Khalji general Malik Nayak. During the 1306 Mongol invasion, Tughluq led the vanguard of the Khalji army, which was commanded by general Malik Kafur, and defeated the invaders.

Alauddin appointed Tughluq as the governor of Multan, and then that of Dipalpur, both in present-day Pakistan. Ghazi Malik's armies mainly consisted of Jat tribesmen recruited from Dipalpur, who fought for him in all his battles. These provinces were located in the frontier region of the Delhi Sultanate, and included the routes used by the Mongol invaders. The fact that Alauddin trusted Tughluq with such challenging assignments suggests that Tughluq must have gained reputation for his martial skills by this time.

Khusrau states that Tughluq defeated the Mongols 18 times; Ziauddin Barani, in his Tarikh-i Firuz Shahi, states this number as 20. Ibn Battuta's Rihla mentions an inscription at the Jama masjid of Multan, which recorded Tughluq's 29 victories over the Tatars (Turko-Mongols). None of the authors provide a list of Tughluq's victories against the Mongols, but these victories probably included successes in border skirmishes.

After Alauddin's death in 1316, Malik Kafur controlled the Sultanate's administration for a brief period with Alauddin's minor son Shihabuddin Omar as a puppet ruler. There is no record of Tughluq opposing Kafur during this period. Kafur dispatched Ayn al-Mulk Multani to crush a rebellion in Gujarat, but was killed soon after, while Multani was in Chittor on his way to Gujarat. Alauddin's elder son Qutbuddin Mubarak Shah then took control of the administration, and sent Tughluq to Chittor with a message asking Multani to continue his march to Gujarat. Multani welcomed Tughluq at Chittor, but refused to continue the march, as his officers had not seen the new Sultan in person. Tughluq then returned to Delhi, and advised Mubarak Shah to send firmans (royal mandates) confirming his position to Multani's officers. The new Sultan agreed, and as a result, Multani's force resumed its march to Gujarat. Tughluq accompanied this force, although Multani retained its supreme command.

== Rise to power ==
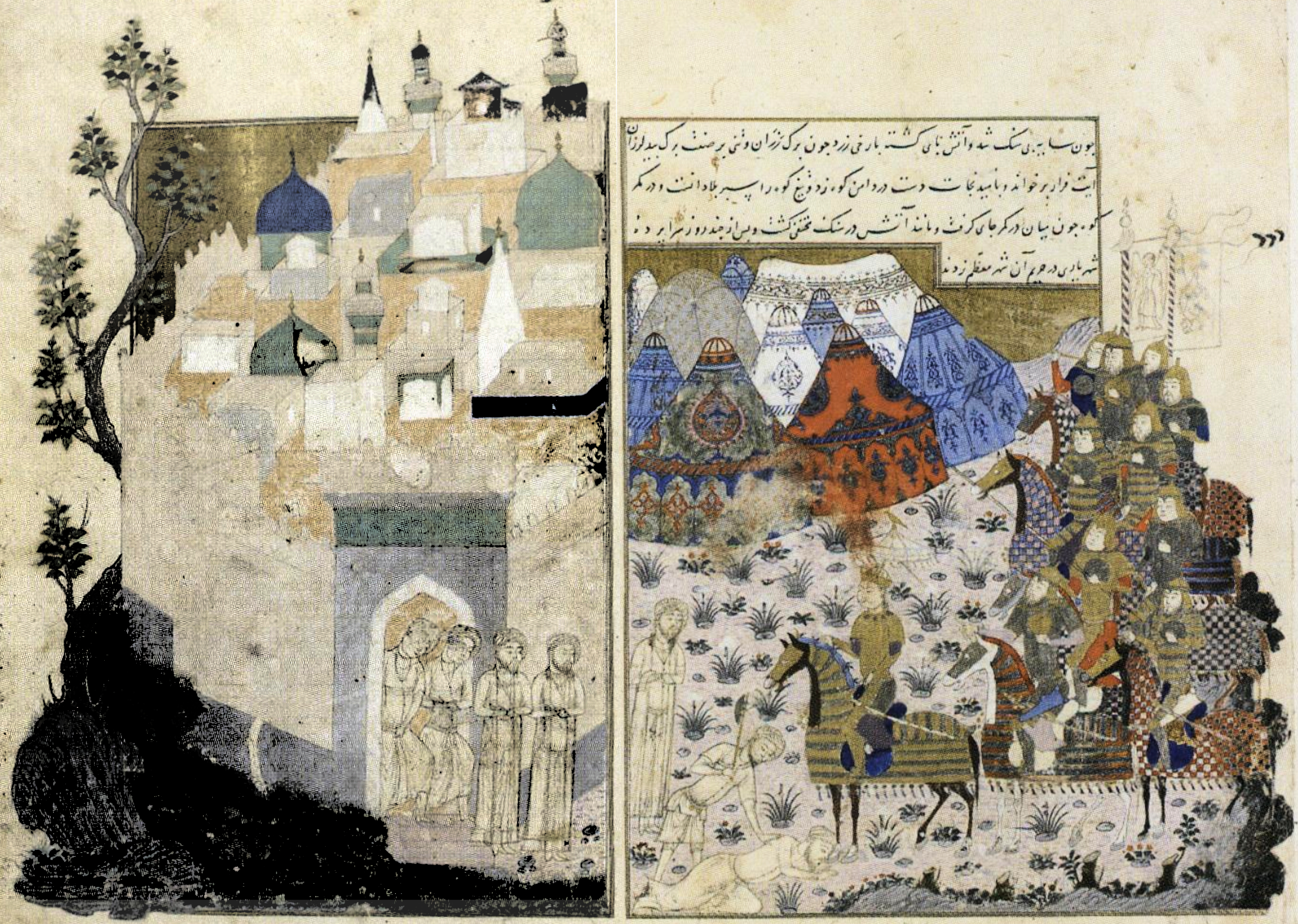
Ghiyath al-Din Tughluq leading his troops in the capture of the city of Tirhut (1324), then ruled by the Karnats of Mithila. A 1410 Jalayrid Mongol illustration of the Basātin al-uns, a book written by Akhsatan Dehlavi al-Hindi, a member of the Tughluq court and an ambassador to Iran. Ca.1410 copy of 1326 lost original. Istanbul, Topkapi Palace Museum Library, Ms. R.1032.

In July 1320, Mubarak Shah was murdered as a result of a conspiracy by his general Khusrau Khan, who became the ruler of Delhi. Tughluq was one of the governors who refused to recognize Khusrau Khan as the new Sultan. However, he did not take any action against Khusrau Khan because the force commanded by him at Dipalpur was not strong enough to take on the imperial army at Delhi.

Tughluq's son Fakhruddin Jauna (who later ascended the throne as Muhammad bin Tughluq), who was a high-ranking officer in Delhi, took the initiative to dethrone Khusrau Khan. He convened a secret meeting of his friends in Delhi, and then sent his messenger Ali Yaghdi to Dipalpur, asking his father for assistance in the matter. In response, Tughluq asked him to come to Dipalpur with the son of the Uchch governor Bahram Aiba, who was also opposed to Khusrau Khan. Accordingly, Fakhruddin and his companions - which included some slaves and servants - left Delhi for Dipalpur on horses one afternoon. Tughluq sent his officer Muhammad Sartiah to take control of the Sirsa fort on the Delhi-Dipalpur route to secure a safe passageway for his son. When Khusrau Khan learned of the conspiracy, he dispatched his minister of war Shaista Khan in pursuit of Fakhruddin, but Shaista Khan could not catch the rebels.

At Dipalpur, Tughluq and his son discussed the situation, and decided to put up a fight against Khusrau Khan. Tughluq declared that he wanted to dethrone Khusrau Khan for "the glory of Islam", because he was loyal to Alauddin's family, and because he wanted to punish the criminals in Delhi.

At Dipalpur, Tughluq and his son discussed the situation, and decided to put up a fight against Khusrau Khan. Tughluq sent identical letters to five neighbouring governors, seeking their support:

- Bahram, the governor of Uchch, joined Tughluq's cause and provided military support.
- Mughlati, the governor of Multan, refused to rebel against the new Sultan. Tughluq's friend Bahram Siraj incited Mughlati's army against him. Facing a rebellion himself, Mughlati tried to flee but fell into a canal built during Tughluq's governorship of Multan. He was beheaded by a son of Bahram Siraj, but the Multan army did not join Tughluq's forces against the Sultan.
- Malik Yak Lakkhi, the governor of Samana, not only refused to join Tughluq, but also sent his letter to Khusrau Khan and himself marched to Dipalpur against him. Yak Lakkhi was originally a Hindu slave, and may have been favoured by Khusrau Khan, which may explain his actions. After Tughluq's forces repelled his invasion of Dipalpur, he retreated to Samana. He was planning to join the Sultan at Delhi, but was killed by the angry citizens before he could do that.
- Muhammad Shah Lur, the governor of Sindh, was facing a rebellion by his officers when he received Tughluq's letter. He later came to terms with his officers, and agreed to support Tughluq, but reached Delhi only after Tughluq ascended the throne. Tughluq later appointed him as the governor of Ajmer.
- Hushang Shah, the governor of Jalor and a son of Kamal al-Din Gurg, also promised to support Tughluq. However, he deliberately reached Delhi only after the battle between the forces of Tughluq and Khusrau Khan was over. Tughluq retained him as the governor of Jalor.

Tughluq sent another letter to Ayn al-Mulk Multani, who had become the wazir by this time. Multani was surrounded by Khusrau Khan's men when he received the letter, so he took the letter to the Sultan and expressed his loyalty. However, when Tughluq sent a second message to him, he expressed sympathy with Tughluq's cause. Multani stated that he was surrounded by Khusrau's allies, and therefore, would not take sides in the upcoming battle. He told Tughluq that he would withdraw on the approach of Tughluq's forces to Delhi, and that Tughluq could choose to retain him or kill him upon becoming the Sultan.

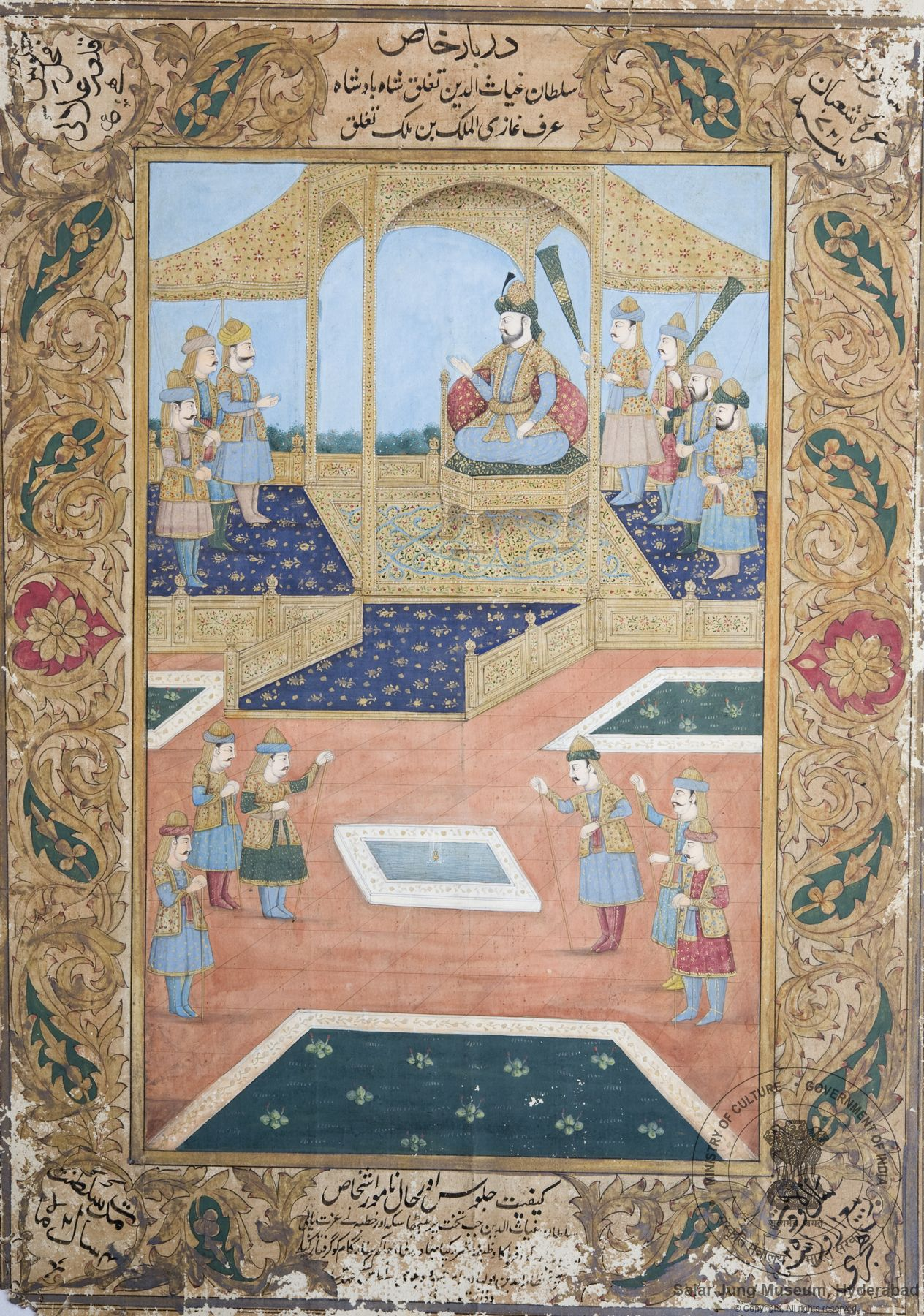
Mughal painting (c. 17th century) with imaginary depiction of the court of Ghiyath al-Din Tughlaq.

According to Amir Khusrau, Tughluq's relatively small army consisted of warriors from a variety of backgrounds, including Ghuzz, Turks and Mongols of Rum and Rus and some Khurasani Persians. However, with the exception of a Mongol officer, Khusrau does not mention any soldiers from these ethnicities. According to historian Banarsi Prasad Saksena, Khusrau's enumeration of these ethnicities is "an official disguise" for the Hindu communities that fought for Tughluq, who claimed to be fighting for the "glory of Islam". The Khokhars were one of these communities: their ruler was Sahij Rai, and their chiefs included Gul Chandra and Niju. The Mewatis, also known as Meos, were another community of Hindu origin that supported Tughluq.

Tughluq's officers captured a caravan carrying tribute from Sindh to Delhi, along with a number of horses. Tughluq distributed the seized treasure among his soldiers.

Meanwhile, in Delhi, to discourage any further conspiracies, Khusrau Khan consulted his counsellors, and ordered killings of Alauddin's three sons - Bahauddin, Ali, and Usman - who had earlier been blinded and imprisoned.

Tughluq's army defeated Khusrau Khan's forces at the Battle of Saraswati and the Battle of Lahrawat. Khusrau Khan fled from the battlefield, but was captured and killed a few days later. Tughluq was proclaimed the new ruler on 6 September 1320.

== Reign ==
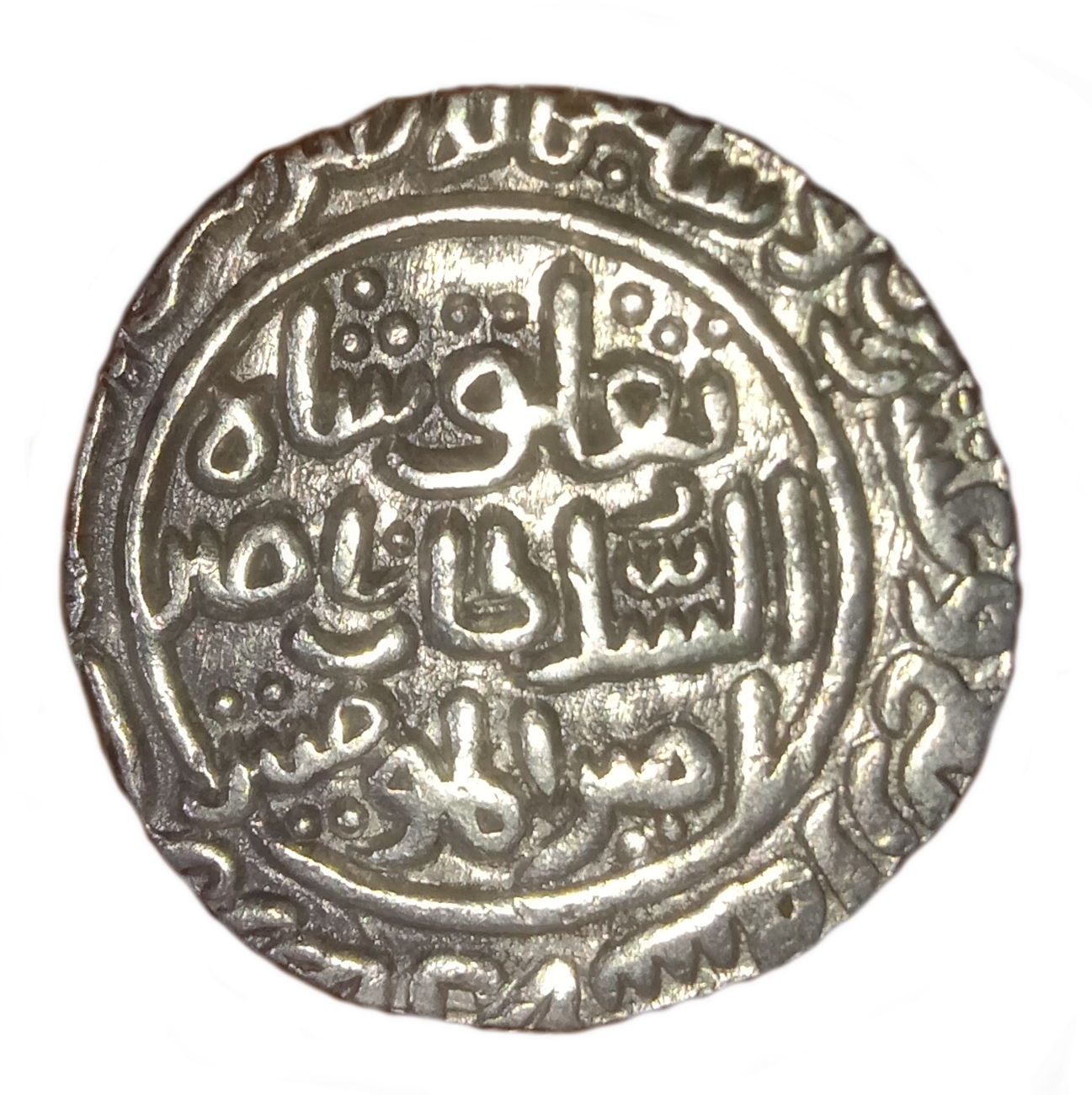
Silver Tanka of the Delhi Sultan Ghiyath al-Din Tughluq, struck in Hazrat Delhi.

Tughluq founded the Tughluq dynasty and reigned over the Sultanate of Delhi from 1320 to 1325. Tughluq's policy was harsh against Mongols. He had killed envoys of the Ilkhan Abu Sa'id Bahadur Khan and punished Mongol prisoners harshly. He had fought various campaigns against the Mongols defeating them in 1305 at the Battle of Amroha. When Tughluq proceeded from Multan to Delhi, the tribe of Soomro revolted and took possession of Thatta. Tughluq appointed Tajuddin Malik as governor of Multan and Khwájah Khatír as governor of Bhakkar and he left Malik Ali Sher in charge of Sehwan.

In 1323, Tughluq sent his son Fakhruddin Jauna (later Muhammad bin Tughluq) on an expedition to the Kakatiya capital Warangal. The ensuing Siege of Warangal resulted in the annexation of Warangal, and the end of the Kakatiya dynasty.

In 1323 he appointed his son Muhammad bin Tughluq as his heir and successor and took a written promise or agreement to the arrangement from the ministers and nobles of the state.

He also started construction of Tughlaqabad Fort.

== Death ==
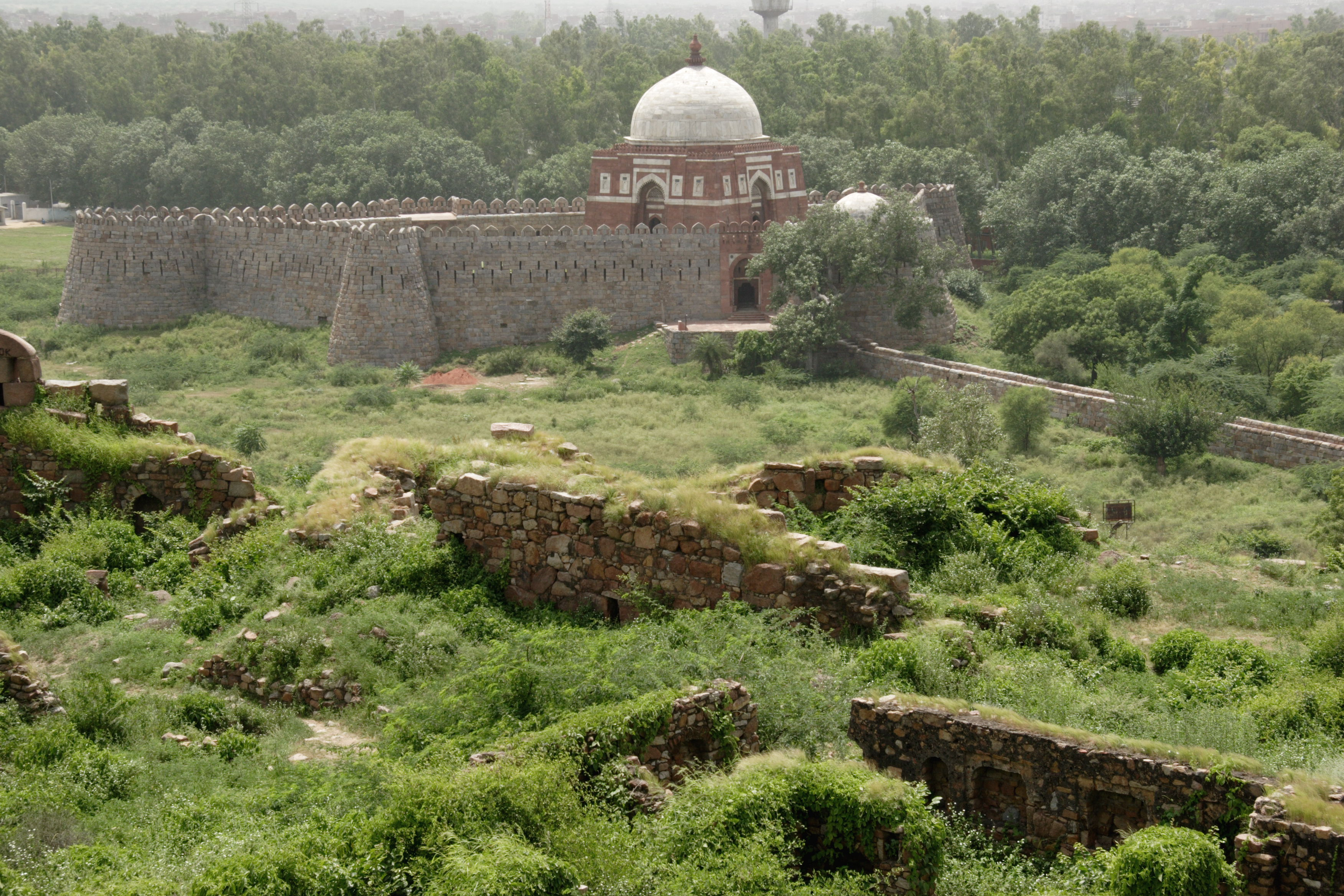
Mausoleum of Ghiyasuddin Tughluq in Tughluqabad.

In 1324, Tughluq turned his attention towards Bengal, then in the midst of a civil war. After victory, he placed Nasiruddin on the throne of West Bengal as a vassal state, and East Bengal was annexed. On his way back to Delhi, he fought and defeated the Raja of Tirhut (north Bihar) and annexed his territory. At Kara-Manikpur in February 1325, the wooden pavilion used for his reception collapsed, killing him and his second son Prince Mahmud Khan. Ibn Battuta claimed it was a conspiracy, hatched by his vizier, Jauna Khan (Khwajah Jahan). Another of his sons, Mas'ud was also executed because his mother was the daughter of Alauddin Khalji, and thus Muhammad bin Tughluq saw him as someone who can challenge his legitimacy.

== Notes ==
Preceded by Khusro Khan	Sultan of Delhi; 1320–1325	Succeeded by Muhammad bin Tughluq
New dynasty	Tughluq dynasty 1320–1325	Succeeded by Muhammad bin Tughluq
