= Muhammad Sadr Ala-i =

Muslim Delhi-based author (1301–1351)

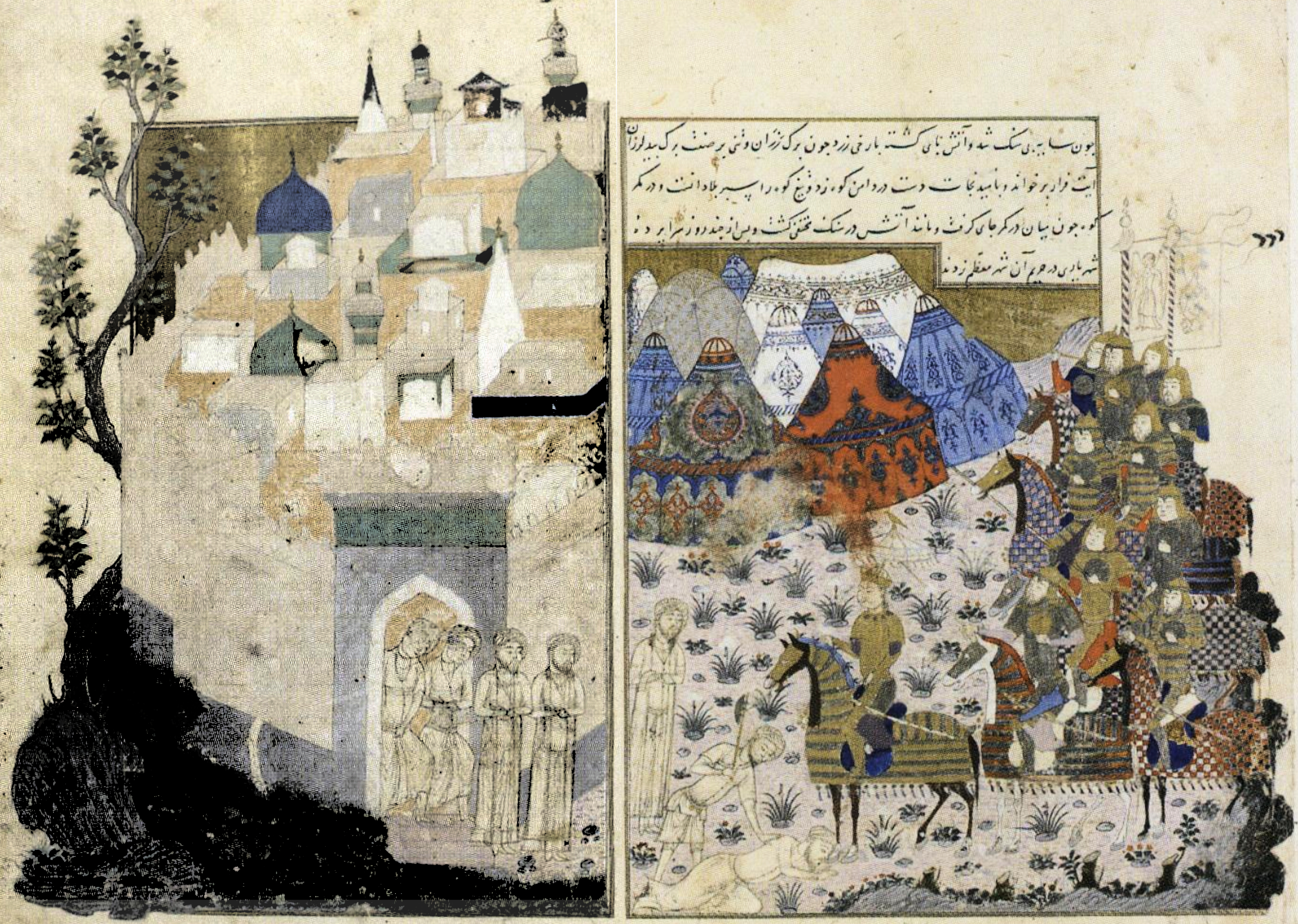
1410 Jalayirid depiction of Ghiyath al-Din Tughluq leading his troops in the capture of the city of Tirhut in 1324, based on the Basātin al-uns by Ikhtisān-i Dabir, a member of the Tughluq court and an ambassador to Ilkhanid Iran. Ca.1410 copy of 1326 lost original. Istanbul, Topkapi Palace Museum Library, Ms. R.1032.

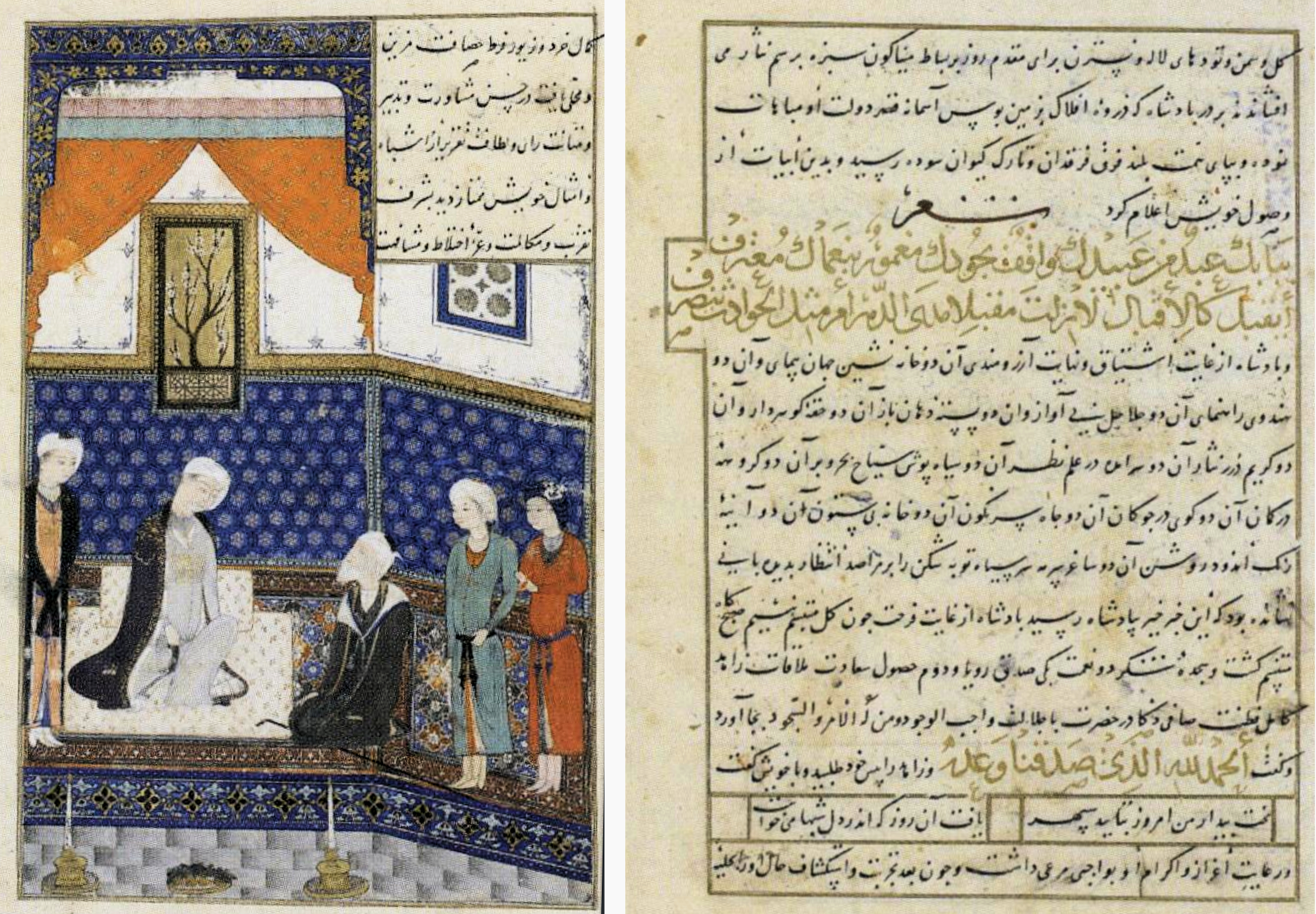
"The ruler of Akhin listens to an ascetic". Basātin al-uns, ca. 1410 copy

Taj al-Dīn Muhammad Sadr Ala-i bin Ahmad Hasan Dabir-i Abdusi Dehlavi (1301–1351), also known as Ikhtisān-i Dabir, was a 14th-century Muslim author who was born in Delhi, India, at the time of the Delhi Sultanate, where he was a hereditary servant of the Court of the Tughlaq dynasty, and a secretary to the Royal Chancelry. He held the high title of Malik at the Court. According to several accounts, he was also sent as an ambassador to Iran by Muhammad bin Tughluq.

== Birthplace ==
The author speaks very highly of his birthplace Delhi, whereby he is called Dehlawi. He is also called al-Hindi which indicates that he came from India. He described "the great metropolis Delhi" as his place of origin, whose earth is "soul rearing", and that "it was in this paradise-like capital that the bud of his youth blossomed in the garden of his body". He excelled there in various branches of knowledge, and had many friends.

== Works ==
He is known for a work in Persian entitled Basātin al-uns ("Gardens of Fellowship"), a partial copy of which, date ca.1410, is now in the Topkapi Museum in Istambul (Ms. R. 1032). This was a Persian translation of a Hindi (Sanskrit) work about a Hindu king Kishwagir, which showed that he was one amongst many Indian Muslim scholars who exhibited their great interest for Indian culture.

His work was dedicated to Muhammad bin Tughluq (r. 1325–51), ruler of the Delhi Sultanate. Muhammad Sadr Ala-i was a member of the Delhi Sultanate royal chancery accompanying Ghiyath al-Din Tughluq, founder of the Tughluq dynasty, in his conquest of Tirhut in northeastern India (the "Lakhnawtī campaign" of 1324). He fell ill on the way back from Tirhut, but was treated by a physician named Muhammad Khujandi. During his illness, he was provided with a Persian translation of a Hindu story, which he would use as material for his book. The main protagonists of the story are a vizier, an ascetic (zähid), the king of Ujjain and Kannauj whom he calls King "Kishvargir", and the daughter of the Chinese emperor named Queen Mulkarai of Serendib (Ceylon). He wrote his book in a few months, adding poems in Persian and Arabic verses from the Koran, and completing it in AH 726 (1325–26), when still 26 years old. The material details described in the book are considered as having good documentary and historical value, explained by the contemporary eyewitness status of the author. His book concludes with the expression of his gratitude for the generosity Ghiyath al-Din Tughluq "who had given him sixty thousand dinars and sixty horses" for a single qasida poem.

The copy of the book known to us, and dated to ca.1410, is a Jalayirid copy and is unfinished. This copy probably dates to the time of Ahmad Jalayir of the Jalayirid dynasty, in Iraq. The space for around 12 miniatures has remained empty, but 2 miniatures, also partially complete, have reached us. One depicts the Rajah of the Indian city of Tirhut surrendering to Ghiyath al-Din Tughluq and his troops. The other miniature depicts the ruler of Ahin conversing with scholars.

Few other, non-illustrated, copies are known: a 17th-century copy in the British Library (Ms. Add. 7717), and possibly another copy by Qavam al Din Muhammad al-Mazandarani in 836 (1433) in the People of Asia Collection (Moscow).

== Sources ==
- Askari, S.H. ‘Historical Value of Basatin-ul-Uns: A Rare Literary Work of the Early Fourteenth Century’, Journal of Bihar Research Society, Vol. XLVIII, 1962, pp. 1–29.
- Siddiqi, Iqtidar Husain (1992). Perso-Arabic Sources of Information on the Life and Conditions in the Sultanate of Delhi. Munshiram Manoharlal Publishers. ISBN 978-81-215-0535-2.
- Basātin al-uns in Persian: Ahmad, Nazir (Professor) (2010). Basateen ul-Uns - Muhammad Bin Sadr Taj 'Abdoosi Akhsitan Dehlavi (Farsi). New Delhi: Center for Persian Research. p. xiii.
