= Siri Fort =

Fort in Delhi

- South Delhi, India in India
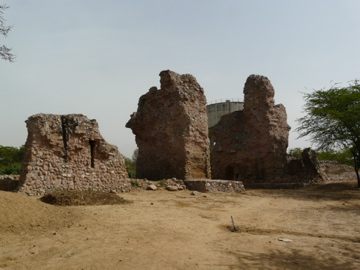
- Southern Gate Ruins of the Siri Fort near Panchsheel Park

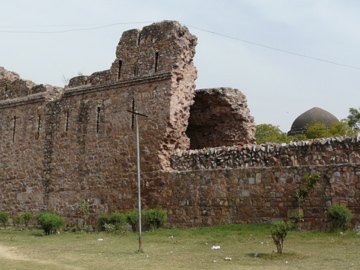
- Siri Fort wall and Tohfe Wala Gumbad dome near the Jat village of Shahpur Jat.

Site information
- Type: Afghan-Seljuk-styled Fort
- Controlled by: Indian Government
- Open to the public: Yes
- Condition: Ruin

Location
- Coordinates: 28.5524°N 77.2235°E

Site history
- Built: September 1303; 723 years ago
- Built by: Khalji Dynasty
- Materials: Stone and Bricks
- Demolished: 1540–1545
- Battles/wars: Mongol siege of Delhi

Siri Fort, in the city of Delhi, was built during the rule of Alauddin Khalji, second ruler of Khalji Dynasty, of Delhi Sultanate to defend the city from the onslaught of the Mongols. It was the second of the seven cities of medieval Delhi built around 1303 which at present is seen only in ruins with a few remnants due to its poor quality construction as compared to previous fort constructions in India (pictured).

Near the Siri Fort ruins, modern auditoriums, the Asian Games Village Complex and residential and commercial establishments fill the modern landscape between the Khel Gaon Marg and the Aurobindo Marg in the heart of South Delhi.

== History ==
Alauddin is the best known of the Khalji dynasty because he extended his dominion to Southern India and established the second city of Delhi, Siri. He created Siri between 1297 and 1307 to defend against Mongol invasions of India and Delhi. In response, he built Siri Fort, mimicked massive Turkish ones. The Fort served as the seat of his power during his campaigns to enlarge his territory. Due to frequent Mongol invasions of West Asia, the Seljuqs took asylum in Delhi. The craftsmen of the Seljuq dynasty are credited with this era's architectural monuments in Delhi.

In 1303, Targhi, a Mongol general, besieged the Siri fort when Alauddin retreated during the Mongol expedition into India. Targhi could not penetrate the fortifications of the Siri Fort and he finally retreated to his Kingdom in Central Asia. Subsequently, Alauddin's forces defeated Mongols decisively at Amroha (1306).

Siri, which is now a part of New Delhi, was later linked to the fortifications of Jahanpanah. Siri was then also known as "Darul Khilafat" or ‘’Seat of Califate’’ In AD 1398, Timurlane, the Mongol ruler who invaded Delhi, wrote in his memoirs, " the Siri is around the city. Its buildings are lofty. They are surrounded by fortifications built of stone and brick, and they are very strong – from the fort of Siri to that of Old Delhi, which is a considerable distance – there runs a strong wall built of stone and cement. The part called Jahanpanah is situated in the midst of the inhabited city. The fortifications of the three cities (Old Delhi, Siri and Tughlaqabad) have thirty gates. Jahanpanah has thirteen gates, Siri has seven gates. The fortifications of the old Delhi have ten gates, some opening to the exterior and some towards the interior of the city."

== Legend ==
According to the legend of Ala-ud-din’s war exploits, the name Siri given to the Fort was because the foundation of the fort was built on the severed heads (‘Sir’ in Hindustani means "head") of about 8,000 Mongol soldiers killed in the war.

== Structure ==
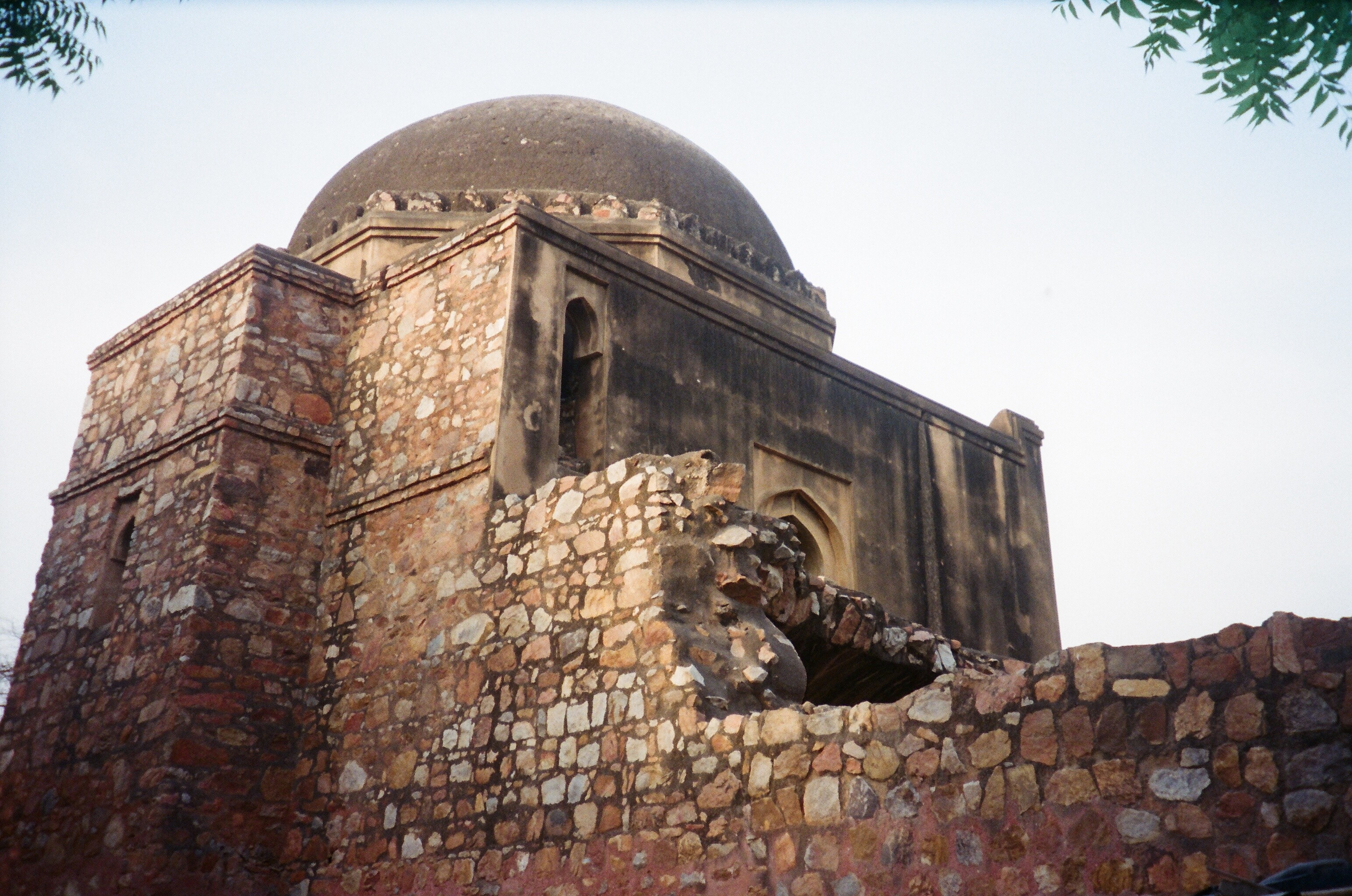
View of Tohfe Wala Masjid in Siri Fort area near Shahpur Jat village.

Siri Fort was built 5 km (3.1 mi) to the north-east of the Qutab Minar on an old camp near Delhi. The first city is considered to be built by Muslims, it was in an oval shape; its ruins are presently seen in an area of about 1.7 km^{2} (0.7 mi^{2}).

Allauddin, the second ruler of the Khalji dynasty, laid the foundation for the City of Siri in 1303 AD. The structures built in Siri were stated to have had a fine imprint of the enthusiasm of the rulers of Khalji dynasty (particularly, the first three out of six Rulers of the Dynasty) with Allauddin's deep interests in architecture and his achievements supported by the imported skills of the artists of Seljuqs richly contributing to the efforts to build the new city. Legend states that Allauddin's prolific building involved engagement of 70,000 workers. The city was built with an oval plan with palaces and other structures. There were seven gates for entry and exit, but at present only the south-eastern gate exists.

The fort was once considered the pride of the city for its palace of a thousand pillars called the Hazar Sutan. The palace was built outside the fort limits, and had marble floors and other stone decoration. Its Darwaza (door) is supposed to have been beautifully decorated. In eastern part of the ruins there are remnants of flame-shaped battlements, loop holes for arrows, and bastions, which were considered unique new additions of that period.

In the nearby Shahpur Jat village (pictured), some dilapidated structures of the period are seen. Tohfewala Gumbad Masjid (pictured) is one such structure whose ruins show the form of domed central apartment and sloping wall characteristic of Khaljis architecture.

Apart from building the Siri Fort, the citadel around it and the water supply system with a reservoir at Hauz Khas Complex (in present Hauz Khas locality) for providing water supply to Siri, his new city, Ala-ud-din also expanded the building activity around the religious city of the first city complex of Qutb complex by making additions to the Quwwatul-Islam Mosque, which doubled its original size, additions to the Qutub Minar itself (Nagari inscriptions on the tower attribute to this tower as "Vijaya sthamba" or victory tower of Ala-ud-din) and a grandiose plan of constructing a new Minar (tower) bigger (double) that of the Qutub Minar. This plan was left half completed, as may be seen from the ruins at the site, due to the death of Allauddin in 1316.

The destruction of the Fort is attributed to the local rulers who removed the fort's stones, bricks and other artifacts for their own buildings. In particular, Sher Shah Suri (1540–1545), of Pashtun Afghan descent from Eastern India (Bihar), took away material from Siri to build his own city.

The battered walls of the fort had a wider base on the outside. A protected passage was provided within the battered walls (now seen in ruins as pictured).

=== Excavation ===
The rest of the structures remained unexplored by archaeologists and these were unknowingly buried when the Asiad Village Complex was built in 1982 for the Asiad 1982.ASI has now launched an excavation programme, since December 2008, to unearth some portions of the wall concealed for centuries which will enable exposing the entire wall providing a continuous link with the earlier excavated stretches of the wall.

== Siri Fort Sports Complex ==
Siri Fort Asia Village complex
| Siri Fort encircled by Sports Complex and Gulmohar Park | Siri Fort Sports Complex |

Near the ruins of the ancient fort city, the Asian Village Complex, popularly known as the Siri Fort Complex, was developed during the Asiad 1982 (the 1982 Asian Games) sports event. The complex was developed in the land around the Siri Fort ruins for the sports event involved. Among these buildings are a large sports complex of courts for tennis, badminton and basketball, a swimming pool, a golf course, gymnasium, aerobics centre, jogging tracks, cricket grounds, large auditoriums, upscale residential buildings, deluxe food joints and commercial establishments. This complex is now under further refurbishing and expansion for the 2010 Commonwealth Games, amidst protests and court interventions.

Restoration works

As part of beautifying the ancient monuments before the 2010 Commonwealth Games, the Archaeological Survey of India (ASI), the custodians of heritage monuments in Delhi, have begun restoration works of several structures which includes the Siri Fort walls. According to their evaluation of three stretches of the fort walls, the first stretch nearer to the Asiad Village is in good shape, the second stretch next to the Panchsheel Park would need conservation actions costing Rs 50 lakhs (US$100,000) and the third stretch next to the Asiad village needs conservation measures costing Rs 5 lakhs (US$10,000). In addition, the stretch adjoining Panchsheel Park, which has been evaluated as in a bad shape, has also been identified for undertaking restoration works at a cost of Rs 30 lakhs (US$60,000).

The Location

The Fort is located at the southern end of Hauz Khas and is 13 km (8.1 mi) from Delhi. It is approachable from Panchseel road in South Delhi. The road from Moolchand to Chirag Delhi passes through the middle of the fort precincts. Siri Fort Auditorium complex (four auditoriums) within the Siri Fort area run by the Directorate of Film Festivals, Government of India has a combined seating capacity of over 2,500. It is a prestigious entertainment centre in New Delhi where film festivals, dance performances, plays and music recitals are organized.

== Gallery ==
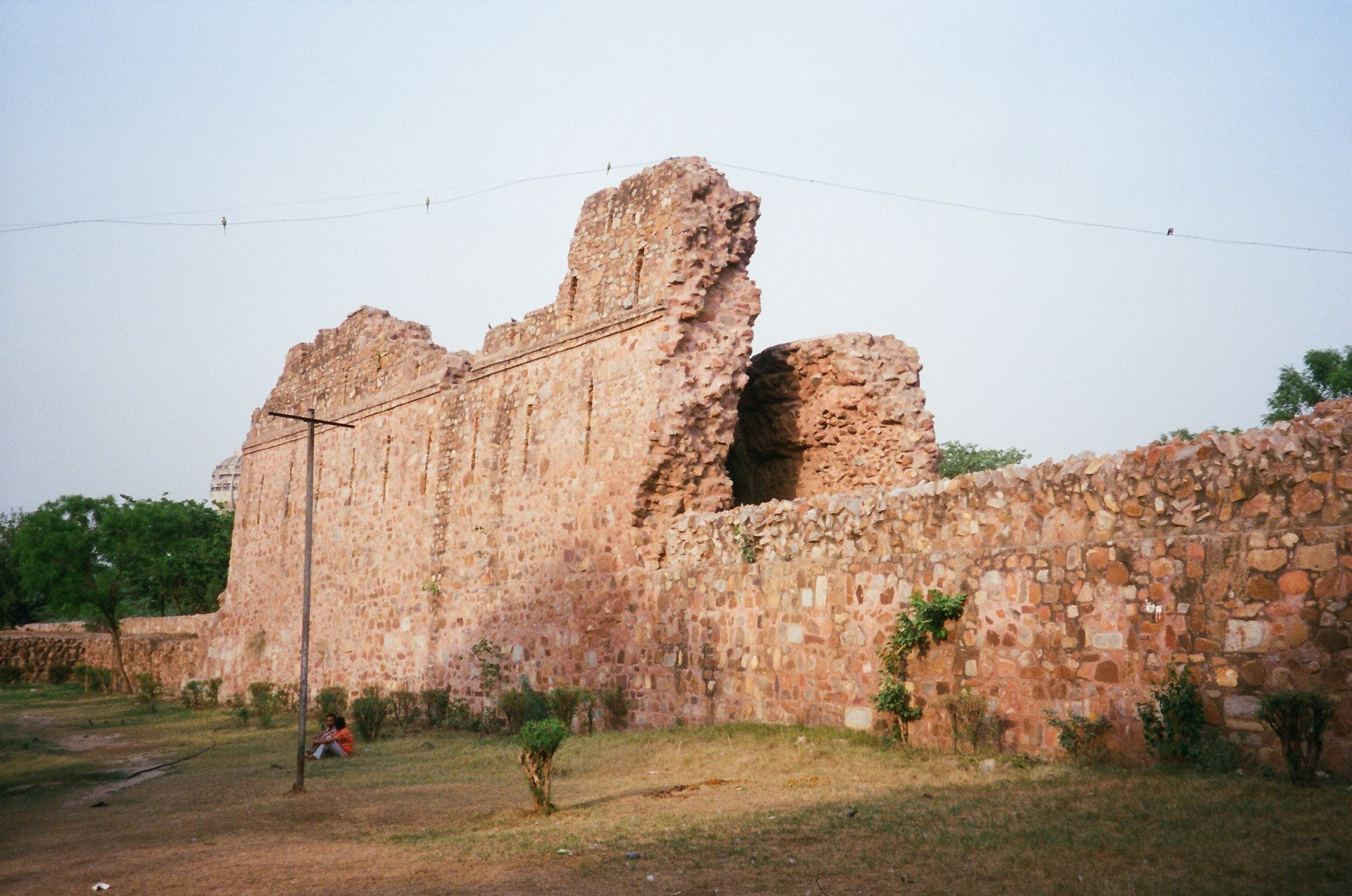
Ruins of the Siri Fort wall

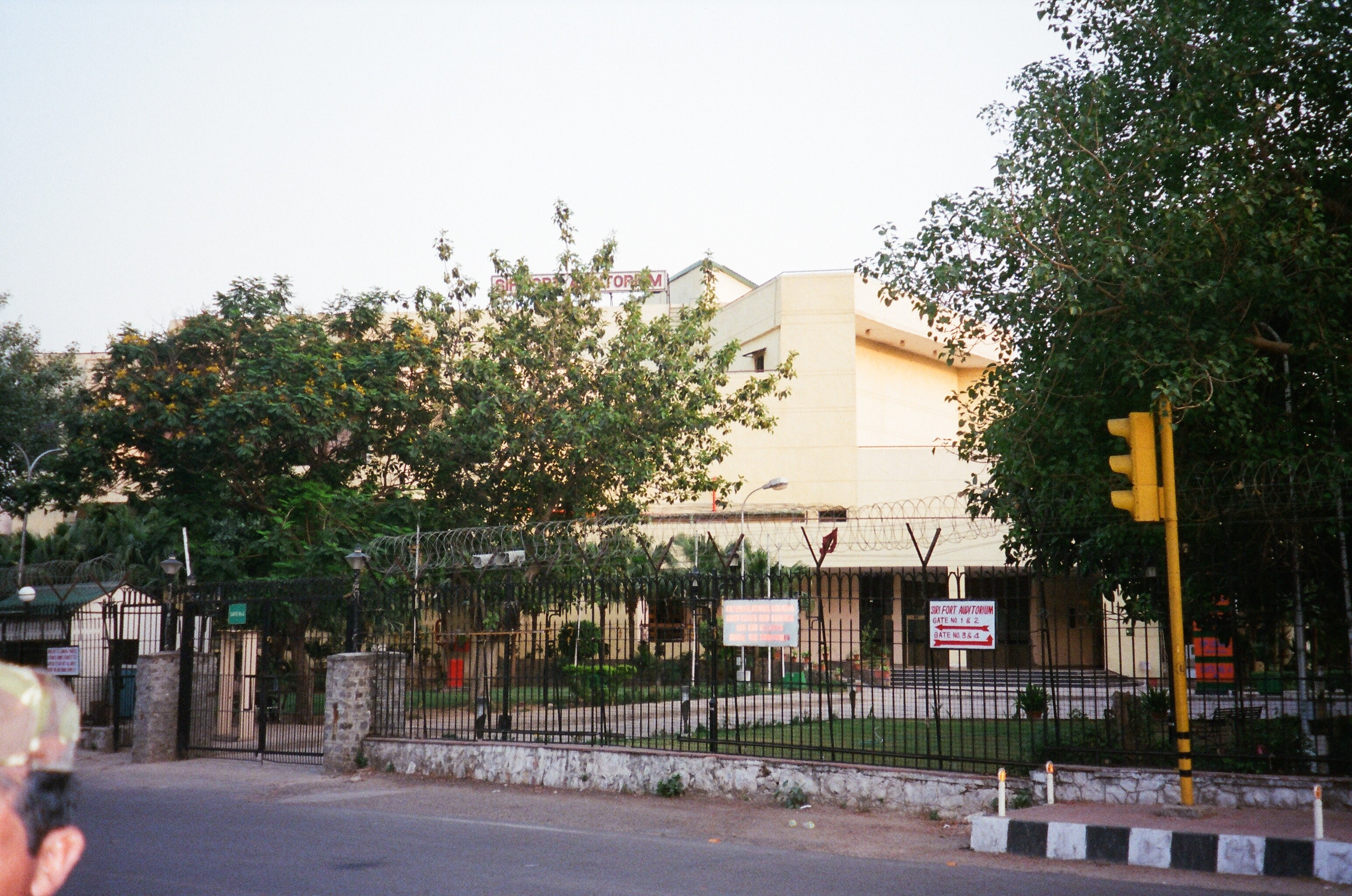
Siri Fort Auditorium

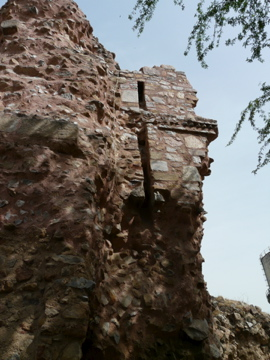
Closeup view of flanking wall of the gate

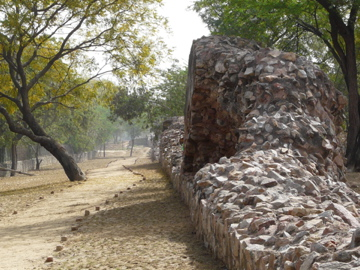
Fort wall ruins in the park

== See also ==
- Capital forts/palaces in Delhi, oldest first
  - Purana Qila, earliest Hindu rulers
    - Indraprastha, earlier than 1000 BCE
    - Edicts & additions by Ashoka the Great (r. 268 to 232 BCE) of Maurya Empire
  - Anangpur, by Anangpal I of Tomara dynasty (r. 736-1152 CE)
  - Qila Rai Pithora
    - Lal Kot, by Tomara dynasty (1152-1177 CE) as capital
    - Qila Rai Pithora, the Lal Kot expended by Prithviraj Chauhan (also called Rai Pithora, r. 1177–92 CE) of Chauhan dynasty
  - Siri Fort, by Alauddin Khalji (r. 1296–1316), second ruler of Khalji Dynasty
  - Tughlaqabad Fort, by Ghiyassudin Tughluq (r. 1320-25 CE) of Tughluq dynasty
  - Feroz Shah Kotla, by Feroz Shah Tughluq (r. 1351-88 CE) of Tughluq dynasty
  - Salimgarh Fort, in 1546 CE by Salim Shah Suri (r. 1545-54 CE), son of Sher Shah Suri
  - Red fort, built in 1639-48 CE by Mughal emperor Shah Jahan when he moved his capital from Agra to Delhi
  - Rashtrapati Bhavan, built in 1912-29 by colonial British raj
- History of Delhi
  - Paleolithic sites in & around Tughlaqabad Fort
  - Stepwells of Delhi
