= Qutlugh Khwaja =

Mongol general, son of the khan of the Chagatai Khanate

- Khan

Khan of Qara'unas in Afghanistan
- Reign: c.1298-1299/1300
- Predecessor: Abdullah
- Successor: Taraghai
- Born: Chagatai Khanate
- Died: c. 1299/1300
- Issue: Daud Khwaja
- Military career
- Conflicts: Mongol invasions of India; Battle of Kili (DOW)
- Dynasty: Borjigin
- Father: Duwa

Qutlugh Khwaja, also transliterated Qutlugh Qocha (Chagatai and Persian: قتلغ خواجه; died 1299/1300), was a son of Duwa, the Mongol khan of the Chagatai Khanate. He became a chief of the Qara'unas in Afghanistan when his predecessor, Abdullah, was recalled by the Chagatai khan to Central Asia around 1298–1299. It seems that later Ilkhans allowed him to settle with his Qara'unas in Afghanistan, though they were struggling with each other.

He launched several attacks on both the Delhi Sultanate and the Ilkhanate. According to Rashid ad-Din, he was a threat to the Mamluks in Delhi. At the end of 1299, a larger force under Khwaja reached the very outskirts of Delhi, leading to the Battle of Kili. Sultan Alauddin Khalji led his entire army to give battle to the Mongols — he engaged the Mongol center while his left wing broke the Mongol formation opposite them and penetrated into their rear lines. This created panic in the rest of the army and the Mongols retreated from Delhi.

Qutlugh Khwaja was mortally wounded during his return from India in 1299–1300. He was succeeded by his lieutenant Taraghai (Targhi), and then It-qul. After It-qul, Qutlugh Khwaja's son Daud Khwaja inherited his realm and soldiers.

== See also ==
- Mongol invasions of India
- Negudar, Mongol general who raided parts of the Delhi Sultanate in the 1230s
