= Madrasa and tomb of Alauddin Khalji =

Historic Islamic school containing a tomb in Delhi, India

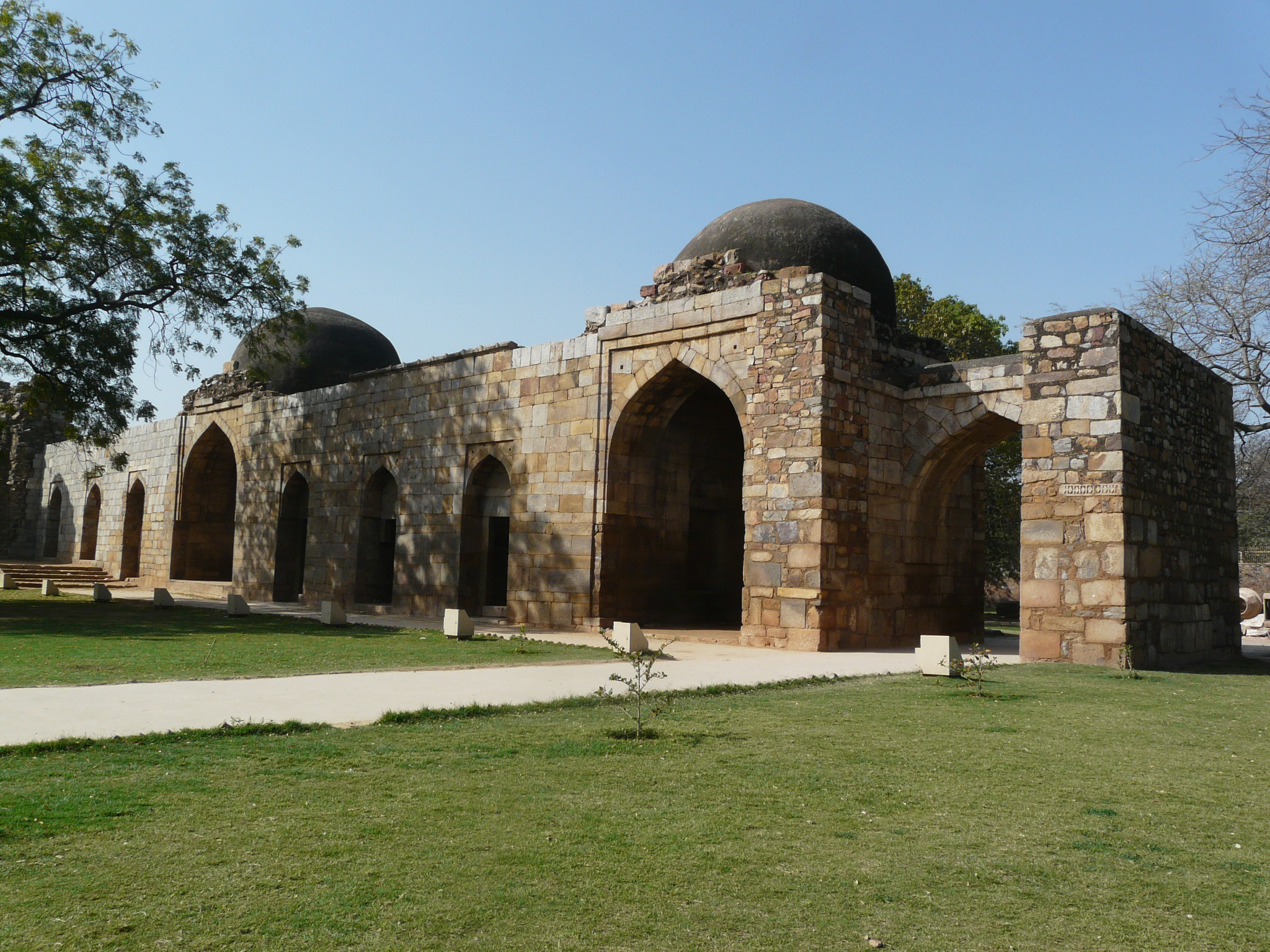
- Madrasa
- Interactive map of Madrasa and tomb of Alauddin Khalji
- Location: Qutb Minar complex, Delhi, India
- Coordinates: 28°31′26″N 77°11′04″E
- Built: 1315; 711 years ago

UNESCO World Heritage Site
- Type: Cultural
- Criteria: iv
- Designated: 1993 (17th session)
- Part of: Qutb Minar and its monuments
- Region: India

Madrasa of Alauddin Khalji is a madrasa (Islamic school) located in the Qutb Minar complex, Mehrauli, Delhi, India. It was built by Alauddin Khalji in 1315, and the tomb attributed to him is located inside the madrasa. This is the first instance of such tomb-madrasa combination in India.

== Background ==
The madrasa was built by Alauddin Khalji (r. 1296–1316) in 1315. The tomb attributed to Alauddin Khalji is located in the central room of the southern wing of the L-shaped madrasa in Qutb Minar complex, Delhi. It is located south west of the Qutub Minar and Quwwat-ul-Islam Mosque.

According to many malfoozat (sayings of Sufi saints), the tomb was a site of pilgrimage and people used to tie threads to seek fulfillment of their wishes. After the release of Padmaavat, a 2018 Historical drama film which includes Alauddin Khulji, the number of visitors to the tomb has increased.

== Architecture ==
The madrasa is one of the four surviving pre-Mughal madrasas in India. It is constructed in an L-shape around a quadrangular court which can be entered through a gateway located towards its north. Only remains of the gateway have survived.

There are seven small cells and two high-domed chambers forming the western wing of the madrasa. The domes are "high-drummed" and corbel arched gateways are underneath them. The domes of these chambers are supported by the corbelled pendentives – the first instance of their use in India. The cells were probably used as the apartments.

Three rooms form the southern wing of the madrasa. The tomb attributed to Alauddin Khalji is located in the central room. The central room measures 16 by 12 feet (4.9 m × 3.7 m). The walls of the room are thick and are made of rock and limestone. However, currently they are eroded except the sharp-edge rocks beneath them. The dome of the room has been destroyed over time. Galleries or narrow passageways on both sides of the central room separate it from the other rooms of the madrasa. The tomb is 7 by 4 feet (2.1 m × 1.2 m). The tomb does not have any headstone or inscription. The tombs in the central and western rooms were discovered during excavations conducted in the early 1900s. The tomb is the first example of a tomb within a madrasa to be built in India, a feature possibly influenced by Seljuk architecture.

== Gallery ==
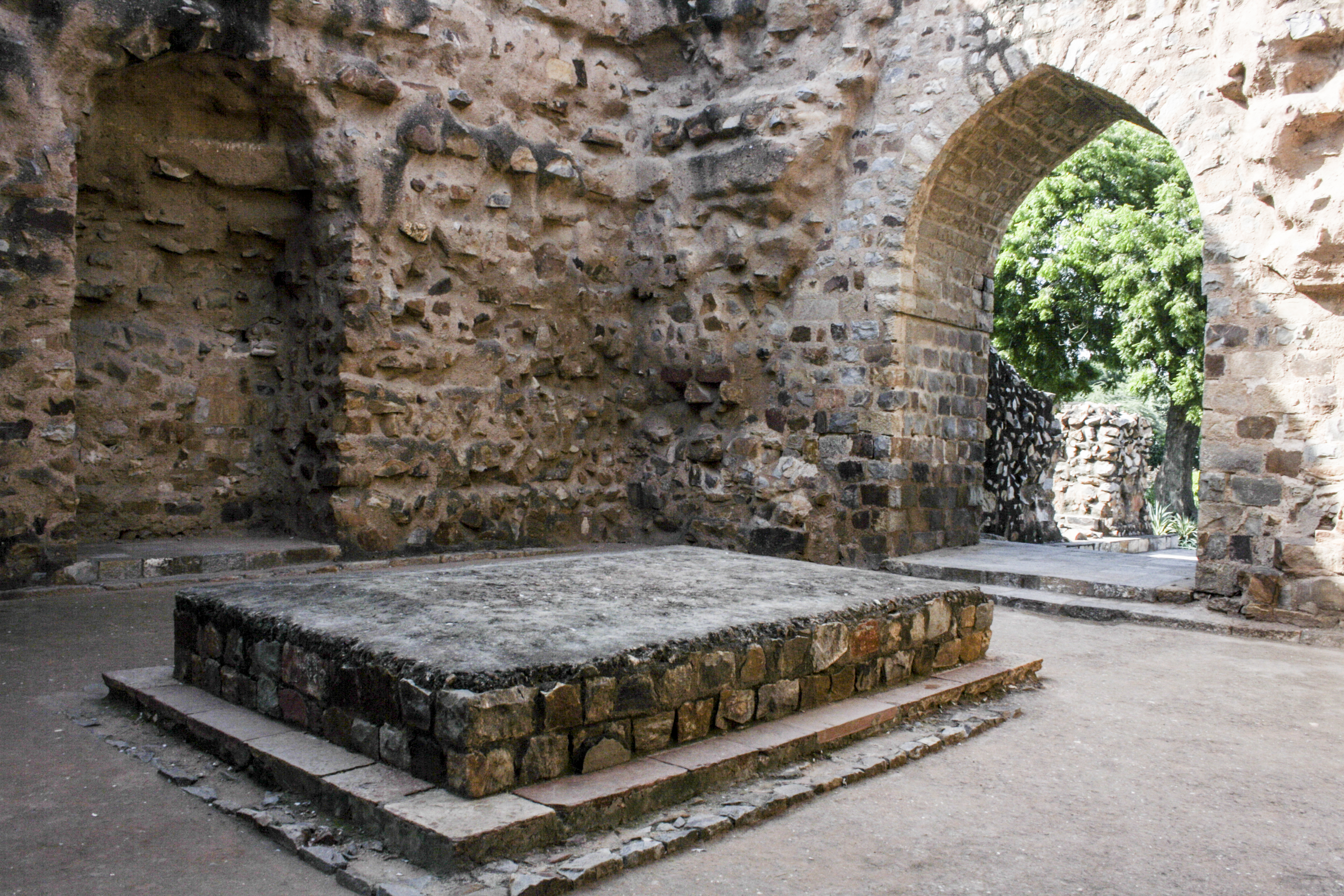
Tomb of Alauddin Khalji

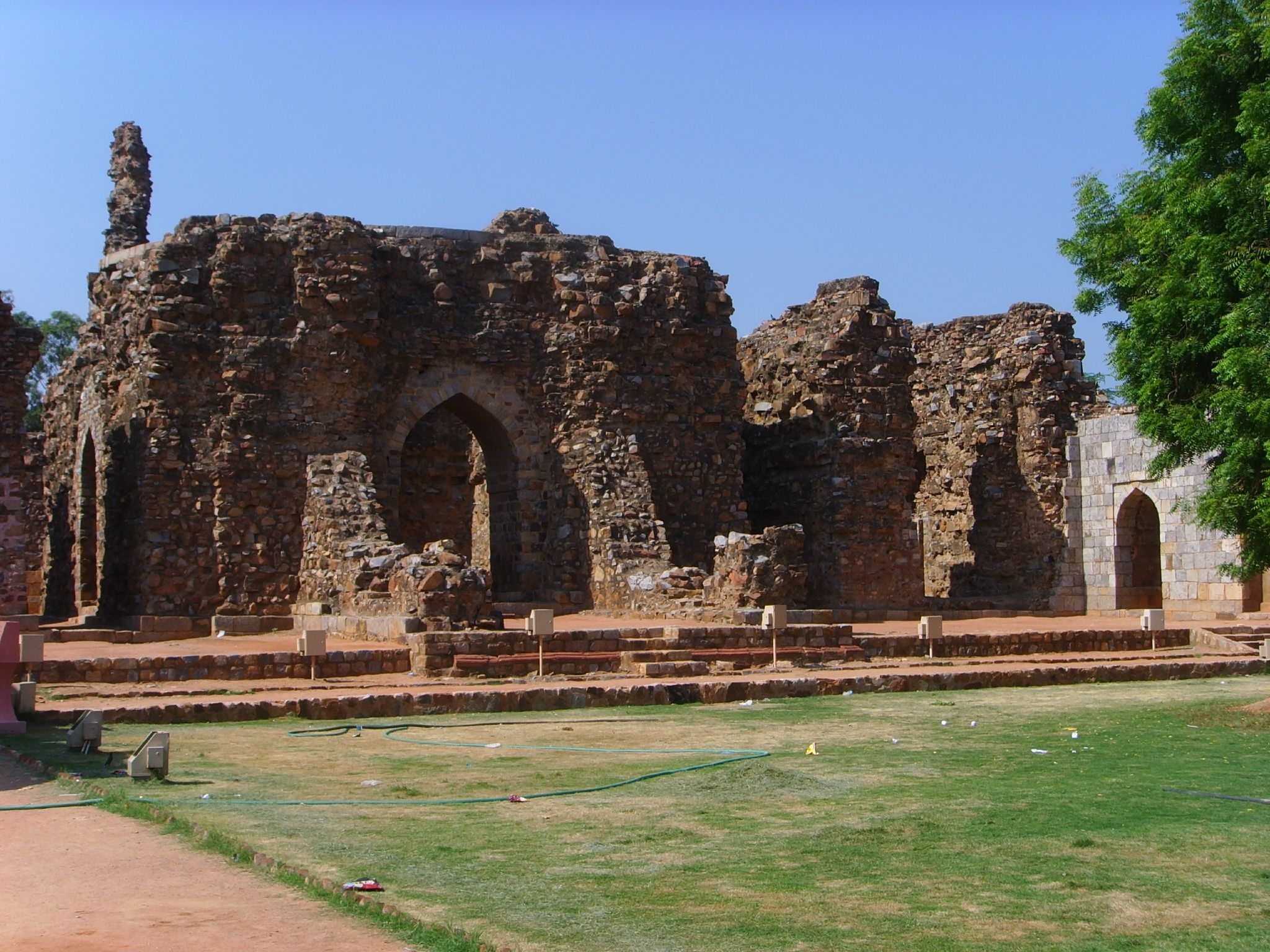
The room in which Khalji is buried

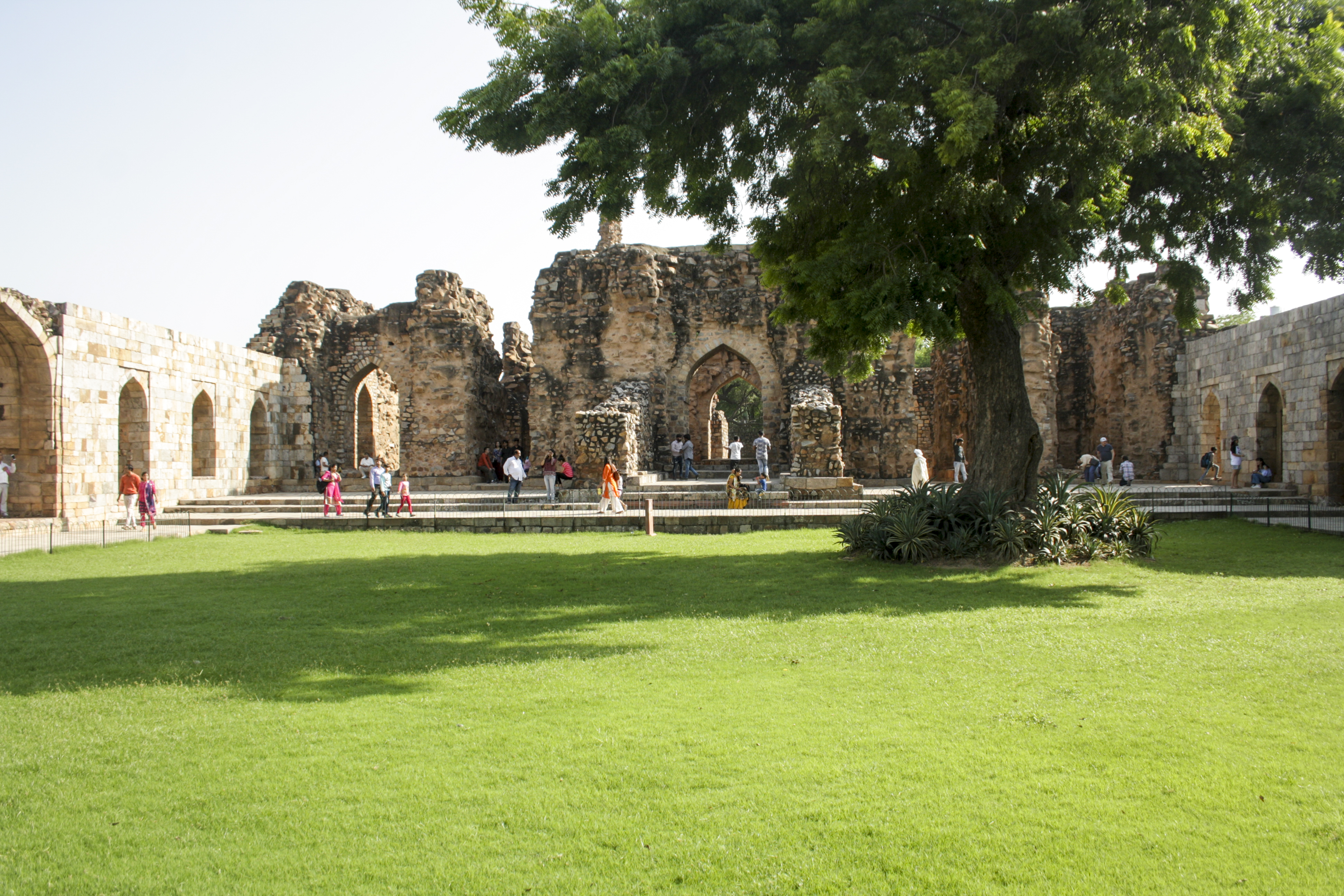
The madrasa as seen from courtyard

The madrasa was a school

== Notes ==
=== References ===
- Sharma, Y.D. (2002), Qutb Minar & adjoining monuments, Archeological Survey of India, ISBN 9788187780076
