= Koil tehsil =

Koil Tehsil
- town
- Country: India
- State: Uttar Pradesh

Languages
  - Official: Hindi
- Time zone: UTC+5:30 (IST)
- Vehicle registration: UP
- Website: up.gov.in

Koil is a tehsil in the Aligarh district of Uttar Pradesh, India. Koil is the old name for the city of Aligarh, and originally, the name was used for the area that is now covered by the Aligarh district. The present-day Koil tehsil is a part of Aligarh city. It covers the area beside the Grand Trunk Road.

The origin of the name of Koil is obscure. In some ancient texts, Koil has been referred to in the sense of a tribe or caste, name of a place or mountain and name of a sage or demon.

Ibn Batutah the famous Arab geographer and traveler has written an account of Kol in his travelogue. This was the area where he was robbed of all his possessions and left unclad: while en route to China from Delhi as Muhammad Tughlaq's envoy to Ukhaantu Khan's court. Which according to H A R Gibb "...spring some of the most lively passages of his narrative, such as his escape from Koel (the modern Aligarh)."

== See also ==
- Aligarh
- Ibn Battuta
