= Master of Ceremonies (disambiguation) =

A master of ceremonies is an official host of a staged event or similar performance.

Master of Ceremonies may also refer to:

== Royal household positions ==
- Master of Ceremonies (Sweden), a position in the Royal Court of Sweden
- Master of the Ceremonies, a position within the British Royal Household
- Grand Master of Ceremonies of France, a position in the former French monarchy
- Grand Master of the Ceremonies, head of the Board of Ceremonies in the Japanese Imperial Household Agency
- Kōke, or "Master of Ceremonies", a position held by some samurai during the Edo period in Japan

== Entertainment ==
- Master of Ceremonies (Styles P album), 2011
- Master of Ceremonies, an unreleased album by Manntis
- "Master of Ceremonies", a spoken-word track by Pink Floyd from Is There Anybody Out There? The Wall Live 1980–81, 2000
- Master of ceremonies, or emcees in rapping
- Master of Ceremonies or the Emcee, a character in both the musical and film versions of Cabaret
