= Tomb of Imam Zamin =

Tomb in Delhi, India

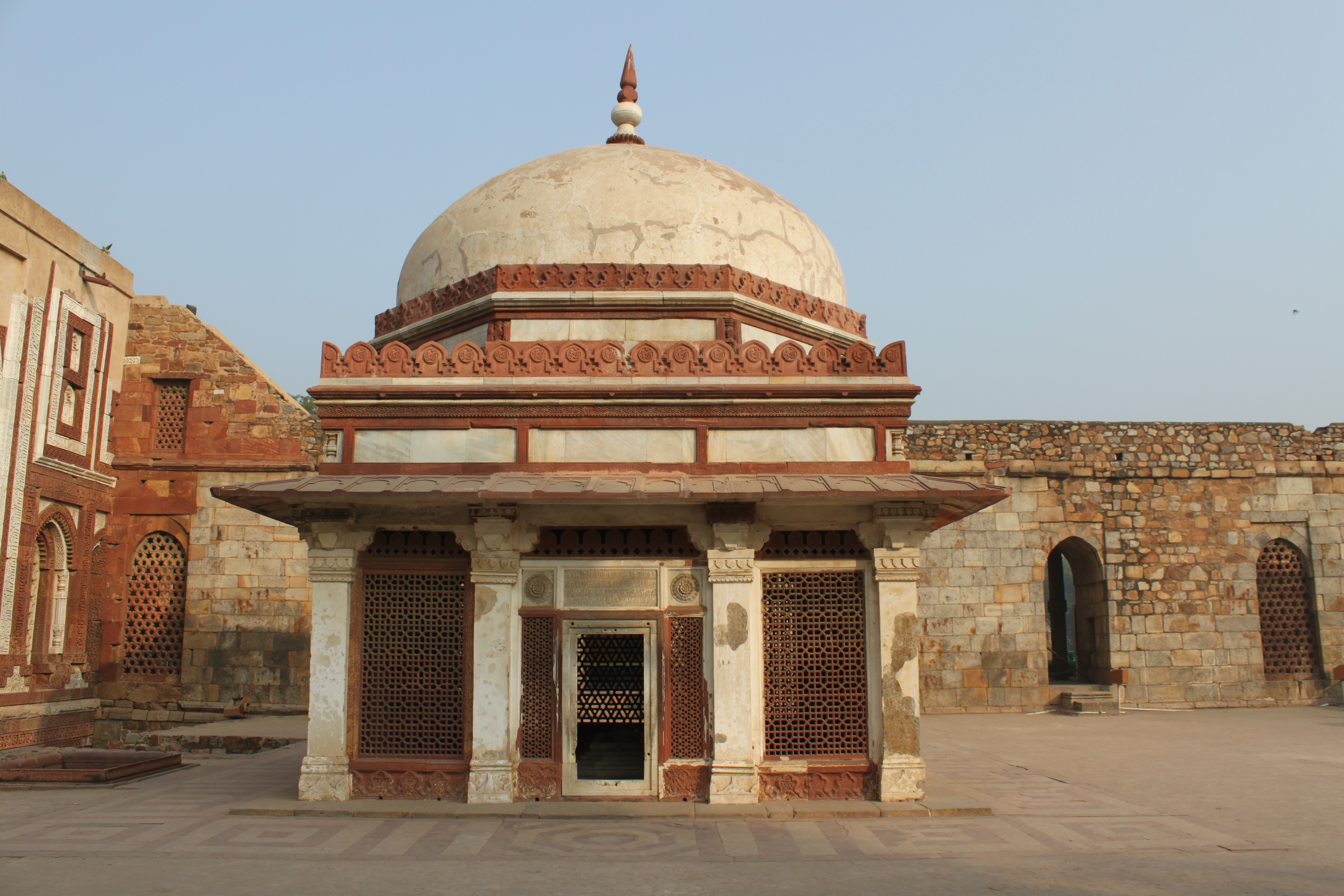
- Tomb of Imam Zamin
- Interactive map of Tomb of Imam Zamin
- Location: Qutb Minar complex, Delhi, India
- Coordinates: 28°31′27″N 77°11′09″E
- Built: 1538; 487 years ago

UNESCO World Heritage Site
- Type: Cultural
- Criteria: iv
- Designated: 1993 (17th session)
- Part of: Qutb Minar and its monuments
- Region: India

The Tomb of Imam Zamin is a mausoleum housing the remains of Muhammad Ali (popularly known as Imam Zamin), an Islamic cleric of the 16th century. It is located at the Qutb Minar complex, Delhi, in India and was built by Ali himself during the reign of Mughal emperor Humayun, long after the original monuments of the complex were constructed. Tomb was built by Sikander Khan Lodi.

== Background ==
Imam Zamin was a direct descendant of Prophet Muhammad, and his original name was Muhammad Ali. Imam Zamin was thus a Sayyid and belonged to the Chishti sect of Sufism. It is believed that he migrated from Turkestan to Delhi during the reign of Sultan Sikandar Khan Lodi and subsequently became the imam (chief priest) of the Quwwat-ul-Islam Mosque at the Qutb Minar complex.

According to the inscription on the entrance, the mausoleum was built by Zamin between 1537 and 1538 during the reign of Humayun. He died in 1539. Located east of the Alai Darwaza, the tomb was constructed long after the original group of monuments and was the last addition to the Qutb Minar complex. Zamin is buried at the centre of the mausoleum.

== Architecture ==
The tomb is built in the Lodhi architectural style. The mausoleum is square in shape and measures 7.3 metres (24 ft) in both length and breadth. The roof is supported by twelve pillars and is surmounted by a sandstone dome with jalis on all the sides, except the west and south. The dome rises from an octagonal drum and is decorated with a marble panel above the chhajja (overhanging eaves or cover of a roof) along with a double row of crenelles. Marble is extensively used for the interior ornamentation and in the construction of the cenotaph. The western side of the mausoleum contains a marble-wrought mihrab (niche in the wall of a mosque that indicates the direction towards which the Muslims pray). The entrance, located at the southern side, is also made of marble.

The entire sandstone structure was originally covered by polished stucco, a portion of which is still extant. The name of Zamin is written in the Naskh script over the doorway of the entrance.

== Gallery ==
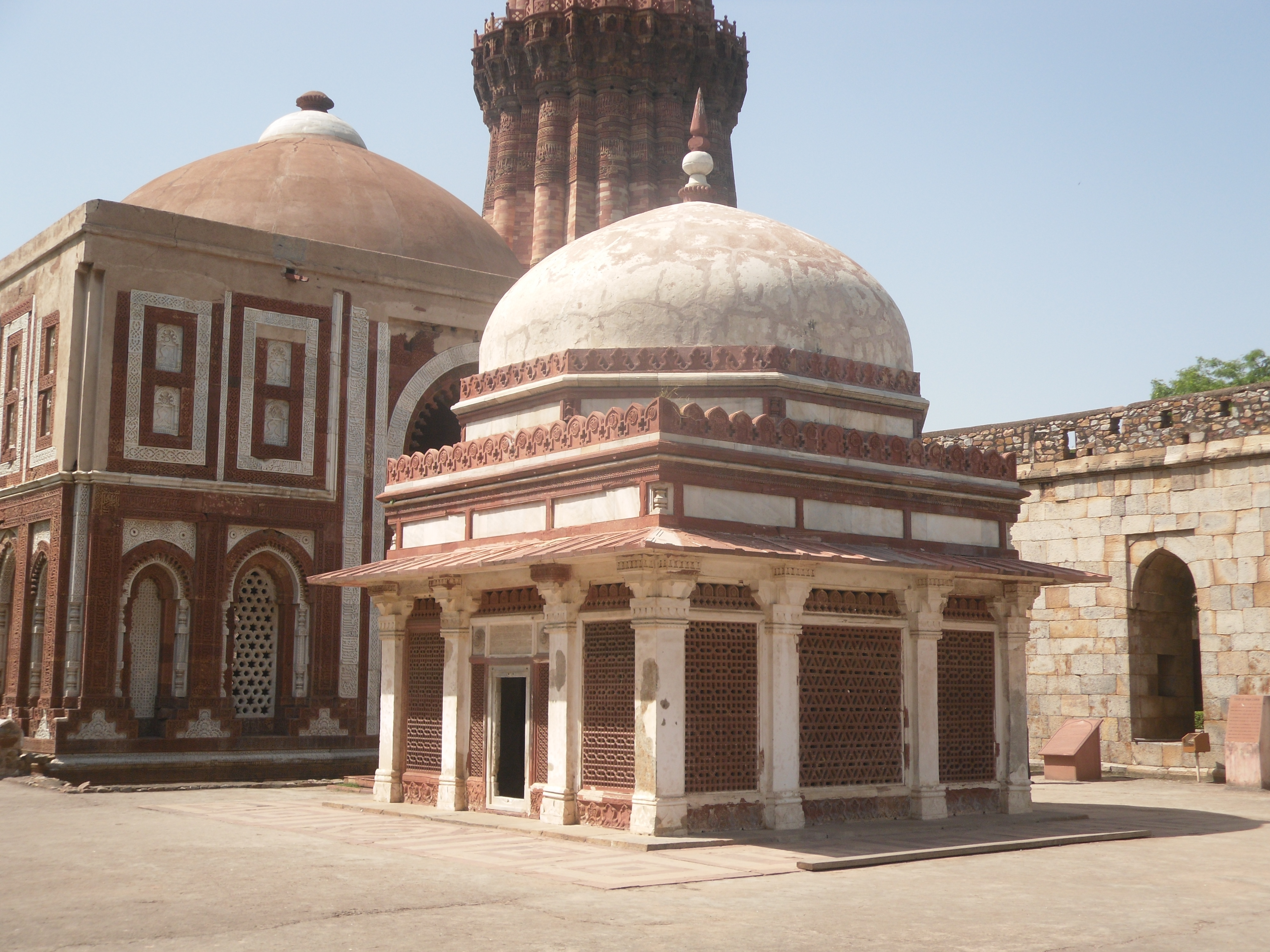
The tomb in the foreground, Alai Darwaza and Qutb Minar at the background

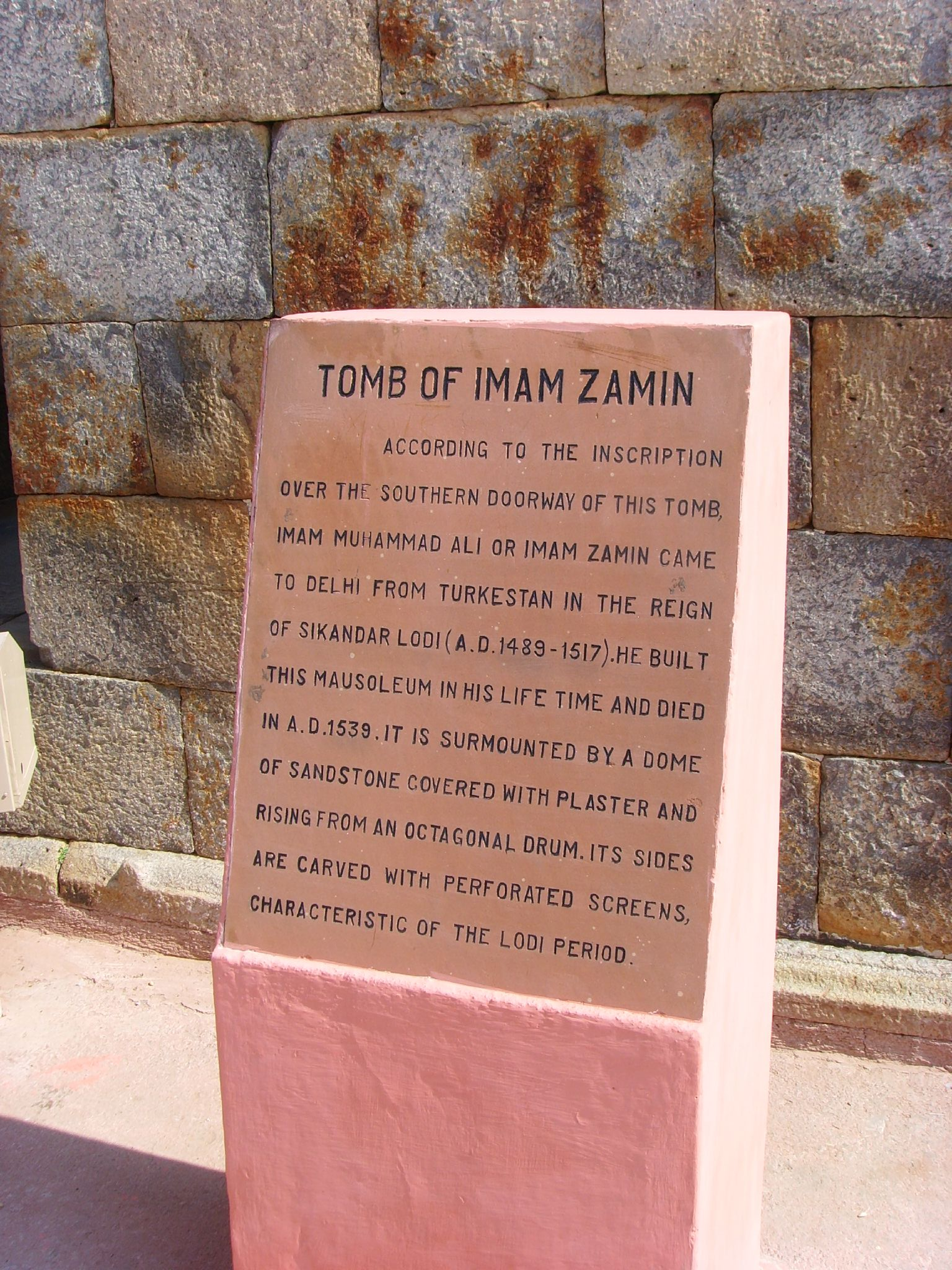
Plaque of the tomb

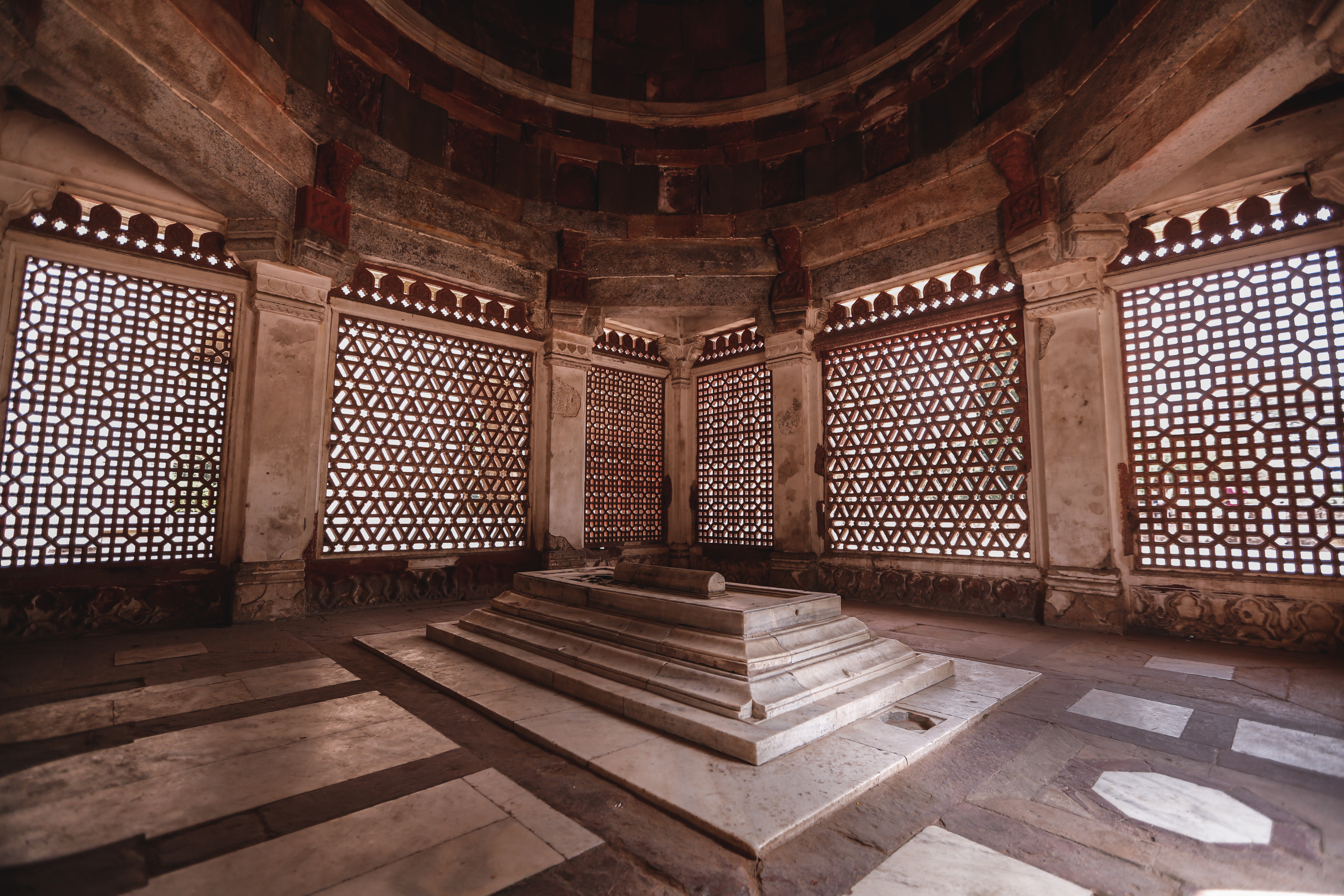
Interior of the mausoleum, the cenotaph made of marble in ground
