= Jhatyapali =

Princess of Deogiri and Khalji Empress

Jetyapali/Jethabai/Jethai
- Born: Deogiri, Maharashtra
- Died: Delhi
- Spouse: Alauddin Khalji
- Issue: Shihabuddin Omar; Qutbuddin Mubarak Shah
- House: Yadava (By birth); Khalji (By marriage)
- Father: Ramachandra of Devagiri
- Religion: Hinduism

Jeatyapali/Jethabai was the princess of Deogiri and a daughter of Rai Ramchandra Dev, the ruler of Deogiri. She was later married to Alauddin Khalji and her son Shihabuddin Omar was appointed as the successor of Alauddin, after his death.

== History ==
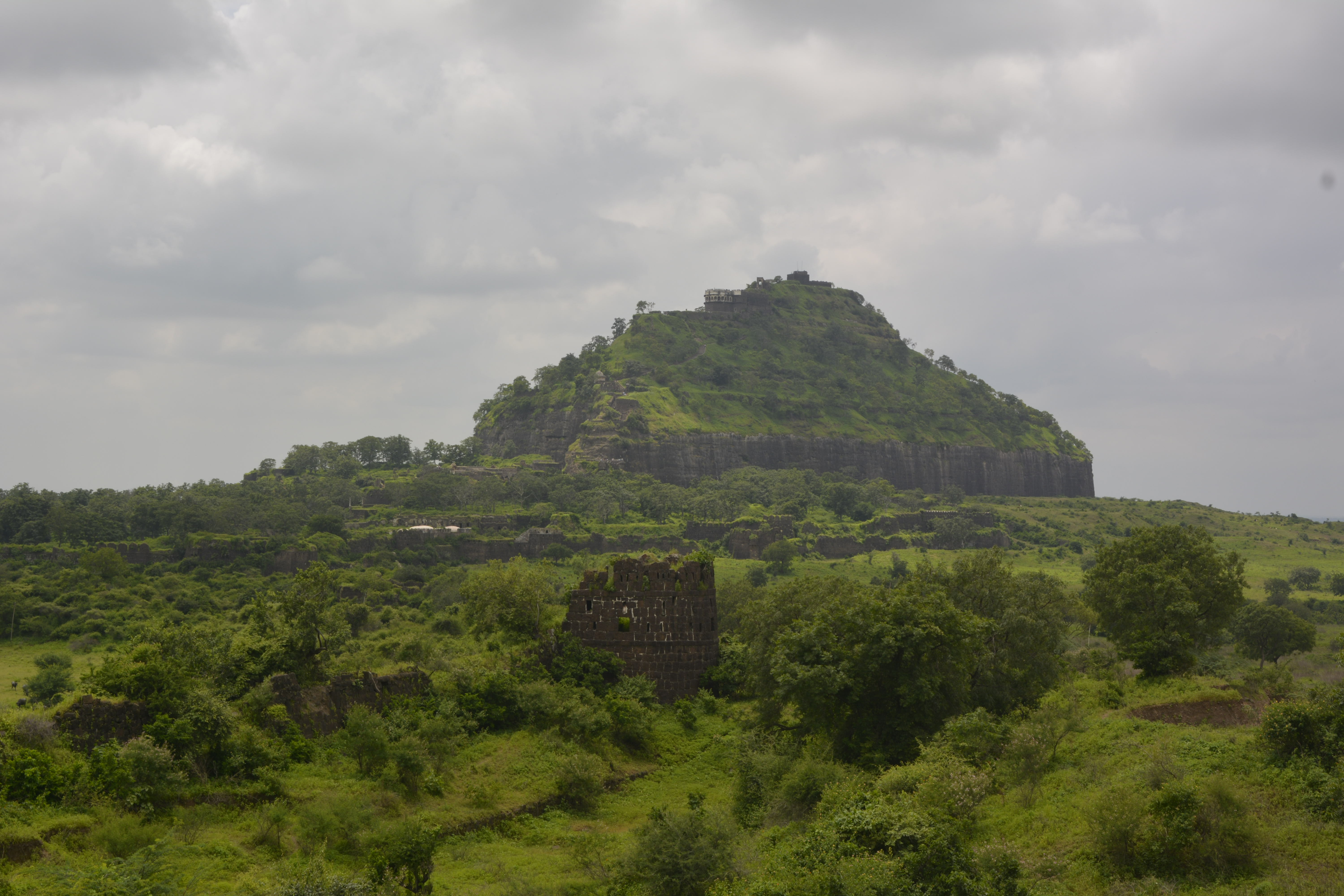
The hill of Devagiri, the capital of Yadavas, the dynasty to which Jhatyapali belonged.

In a bid to fulfil his desire of territorial expansion, Alauddin first raided Deogiri in 1296. The Deogiri at the time of his raid was ruled by Rai Ramchandra, the Yadava ruler, with his son Simhana as the supreme commander of the Yadava army. Simhana was on an expeditionary mission during Alauddin's invasion and Ramchandra was not able to withstand the invading army from Delhi. Though Yadava gave formidable challenge to Alauddin they were not able to cope up with the situation due to absence of Simhana from the battlefield. Ramchandra then sent a message of truce, which was welcomed by Alauddin as he wanted to return Delhi as soon as possible.

They came to an agreement in which a large amount of wealth along with precious gifts were given to Alauddin as war indemnity. Ramchandra Dev also promised to pay annual tribute to him, which made the treaty possible. After his return to the Deogiri, Simhana came to know about the derogatory peace treaty with Delhi and he pressed his father to stop paying tribute in a bid to express his independence from the subordination.

The failure of Ramchandra to pay the annual tribute dragged Alauddin's attention to the Deogiri once again. After his successful expeditions of Chittor and Malwa, Alauddin was compelled to send two armies to Deogiri for a second showdown. This time Yadavas were routed; as the combined forces of Delhi, one which was sent to displace Rai Karana Singh Vaghela, the Rajput ruler of Gujarat, who was defeated earlier by Alauddin and was seeking refuge at Baglana on the border of south Gujarat and another particularly for Deogiri campaign under Malik Kafur pushed their way into Yadava's territory.

There was a strict order from the Alauddin to his Generals to not harm the family of Rai. Hence, Rai along with his kinsmen were brought to Delhi in an honourable way while Deogiri was left under the charge of Simhana. After keeping him as his guest in Delhi for some time; Rai was honoured with a canopy (the royal insignia) and vast amount of wealth was bestowed upon him. Nausiri, a territory of Gujarat was also awarded to him as gift. During this time, Ramchandra decided to give his daughter Jhatyapali in marriage to Alauddin. The bride was accepted and the relations of Deogiri with Delhi reached new heights.

== Life as Empress ==
Shihabuddin Omar, the son of Jhatyapali, who was merely six years old was appointed by Malik Kafur, the slave General of Alauddin as his successor while the other sons of Alauddin including Qutbuddin Mubarak Shah were either blinded or detained. This was done by Kafur to strengthen his holds upon the Sultanate.

According to Ferishta, in order to legitimise his rule Malik Kafur married Jhatyapali and became the step-father of the boy Sultan. The fate of Alauddin's family engineered by Kafur to fulfill his ambitions was not liked by some of the earlier nobles and bodyguards (Paiks) of Alauddin, who plotted and assassinated Kafur, which was followed by freeing of Mubarak Shah, another adult son of Alauddin.

Mubarak Shah took over the affairs of state in his hand as the regent and for some time his younger brother Shihabuddin was restored as the Sultan. After working as regent for some time, Mubarak complained that Jhatyapali, the queen mother had conspired to poison him and taking it as pretext, he sent Shihabuddin as prisoner to Gwalior, where he was blinded but no step was taken against Jhatyapali.

== Death ==
In 1320, Khusrau Khan, the General and partner of homosexual Sultan Qutubuddin Mubarak Shah, raised the army of Baradus, a Hindu military clan. He assassinated the Sultan and in order to eliminate all the possible claimants to the throne, he attacked the royal harem. All the surviving princes were ordered to be killed. Jhayatapali, the mother of Mubarak Shah was also killed during the Coup.
