= Qutbuddin Mubarak Shah =

Sultan of Delhi from 1316 to 1320

Mubarak Shah I
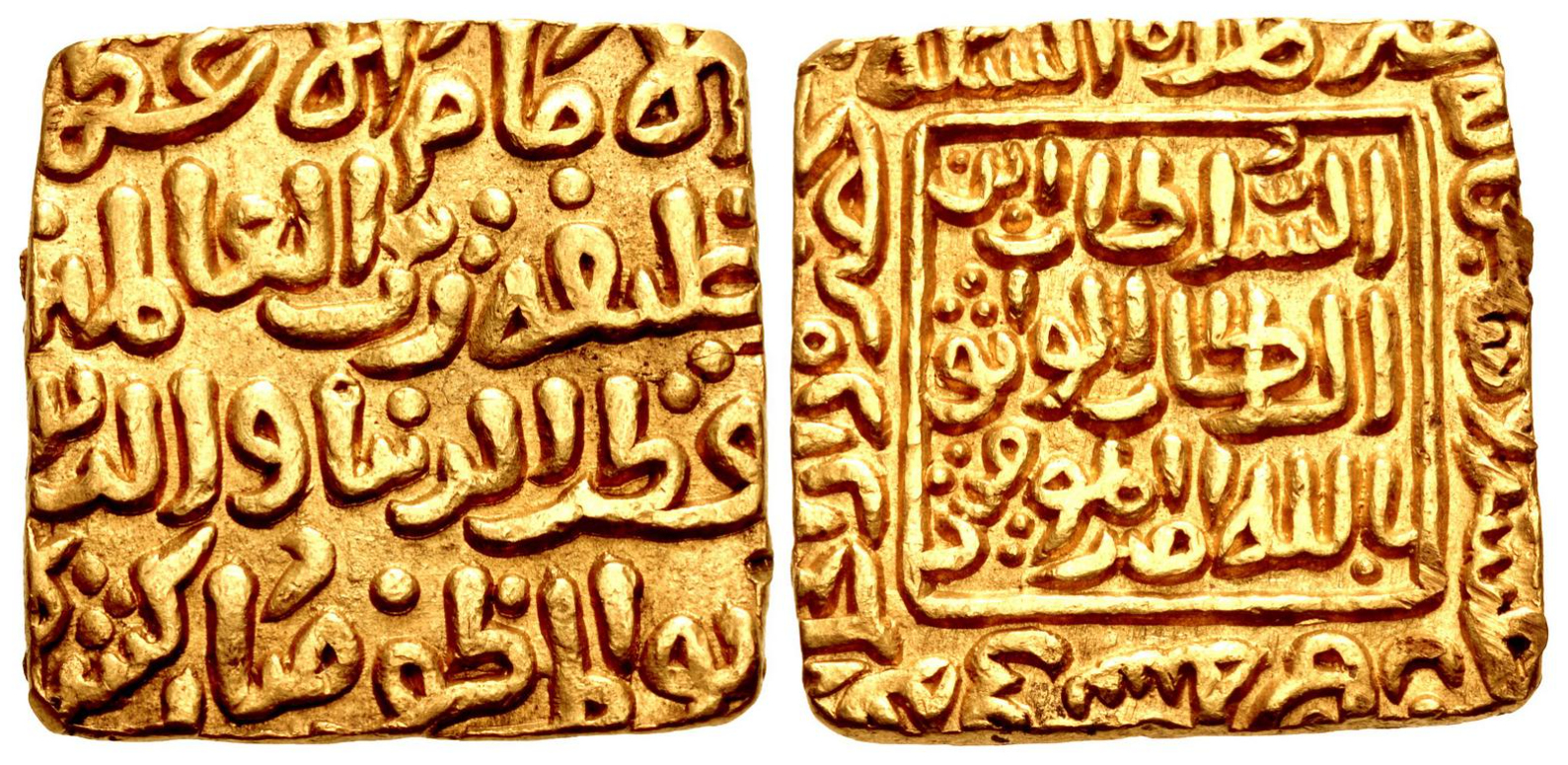
- Gold square tanka of Qutb al-Din Mubarark, minted in Delhi, AH 718 (1318/19 CE).

15th Sultan of Delhi
- Reign: 14 April 1316 – 9 July 1320
- Coronation: 14 April 1316
- Predecessor: Shihabuddin Omar
- Successor: Khusrau Khan
- Born: Mubarak Shah c. 1299
- Died: 9 July 1320 (aged 20–21); Hazar Sutun, Delhi
- Issue: A daughter, married Firuz Shah Tughlaq
Regnal name
- Al-Imam al-Azam Khalifatullaha Rabb ul-Alamin Qutb ud-Dunya Wa'l-Din Abu'l Muzaffar Mubarak Shah al-Sultan ibn al-Sultan al-Wathiq billah Sikander al-Zaman Yamin al-Khilafat Nasir Amir al-Muminin (Note: الامام الاعظم خلیفۃ اللہ رب العالمین قطب الدنیا والالدین ابوالمظفر مبارک شاہ السلطان ابن السلطان الواثق با اللہ سکندر الزمان یمین الخلافت امیر المومنین; lit. 'The Great Imam, the Caliph of God [who is] the God of all Universes, Pillar of the World and the Religion, the Father of Victory, Mubarak Shah, the Sultan son of the Sultan, One who trusts in God, the Conqueror of the Age, the Right Hand of the Caliphate, the Helper of the Leader of the Believers')
- Dynasty: Khalji
- Father: Alauddin Khalji
- Mother: Jhatyapali
- Religion: Sunni Islam

Qutb-ud-Din Mubarak Shah I (c. 1299 – 9 July 1320) was a ruler of the Delhi Sultanate of present-day India. A member of the Khalji dynasty, he was a son of Alauddin Khalji.

After Alauddin's death, Mubarak Shah was imprisoned by Malik Kafur, who appointed his younger brother Shihabuddin Omar as a puppet monarch. After Malik Kafur's murder, Mubarak Shah became the regent. Soon after, he blinded his brother, and usurped the power. After ascending the throne, he resorted to populist measures, such as abolishing the heavy taxes and penalties imposed by his father, and releasing thousands of prisoners.

He curbed a rebellion in Gujarat, recaptured Devagiri, and successfully besieged Warangal to extract a tribute. He was murdered because of a conspiracy by his slave general Khusrau Khan, who succeeded him on the throne.

== Early life ==
Mubarak Shah, also called Mubarak Khan, was a son of Alauddin Khalji and Jhatyapali, the daughter of Ramachandra of Devagiri. After Alauddin died on 4 January 1316, his slave-general Malik Kafur appointed Alauddin's 6-year-old son Shihabuddin as a puppet monarch, and himself held the power as regent. At Shihabuddin's coronation ceremony, Mubarak Shah and other sons of Alauddin were ordered to kiss Shihabuddin's feet.

Later, Kafur started persecuting Alauddin's family members, whom he considered a threat to his control over the throne. Mubarak Shah, who was a major threat as one of the few adult sons of Alauddin, was imprisoned. The former bodyguards (paiks) of Alauddin, who disapproved of Kafur's actions, freed Mubarak Shah after killing Kafur. According to an account mentioned by the 16th century chronicler Firishta, Kafur had sent some paiks to blind Mubarak Shah, but the captive prince gave them his jeweled necklace, and convinced them to kill Kafur instead. However, this account is a later-day fabrication: according to the earlier chronicler Ziauddin Barani, the paiks took the initiative to kill Kafur on their own.

== Regency ==
After Kafur's murder, the nobles offered the post of regent (naib-i mulk) to Mubarak Shah. However, Mubarak Shah believed that as a regent, his life would be in constant danger. Initially, he rejected the offer, and instead requested to be allowed to flee to another country with his mother. Nevertheless, the nobles persuaded him to accept the regency.

Mubarak Shah thus became the regent of his younger step-brother Shihabuddin. Some weeks later, he accused Shihabuddin's mother Jhatyapalli of trying to poison him. Subsequently, he had Shihabuddin imprisoned in Gwalior and blinded, and usurped the throne.

== Ascension ==
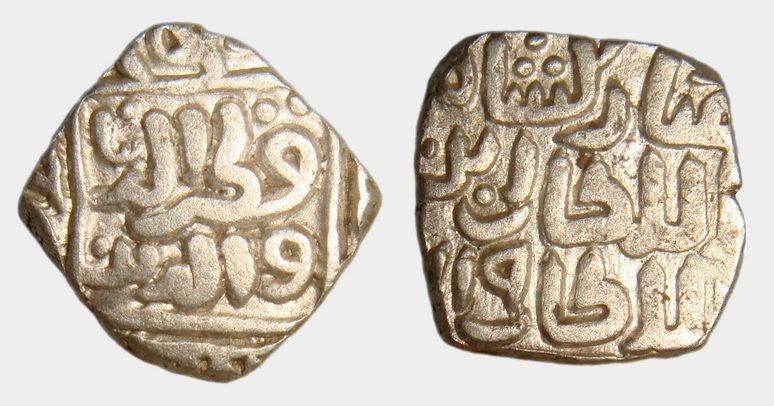
Square Billon 8 gani of Mubarak Shah

Mubarak Shah ascended the throne with the title Qutubuddin on 14 April 1316, when he was 17 or 18 years old. Mubarak Shah retained Alauddin's officers and governors, which ensured a stable government during the first year of his reign. He also made some new appointments:

- Malik Dinar, who held the office of shuhna-i pil (Keeper of the Elephants) under Alauddin, was given the title of Zafar Khan. Later, Mubarak Shah married his daughter.
- Muhammad Maulana, a maternal uncle of Mubarak Shah, was given the title Sher Khan.
- Maulana Ziauddin, the son of the Sultan's calligraphy teacher Maulana Bahauddin, was given the title Qazi Khan and the office of sadr-i jahan. A gold dagger studded with jewels was also presented to him.
- Malik Qara Beg, one of Alauddin's senior officers, was given around 14 offices. His sons also received high posts.
- Malik Fakhruddin Juna, a son of Tughluq (Ghazi Malik), was given the office of Amir Akhur (Master of Horse).
- The slave Hasan was given the title Khusrau Khan, with the fief of Malik Kafur. Later, within Mubarak Shah's first regnal year, he was promoted to vazir.

The paiks who had killed Malik Kafur claimed credit for putting Mubarak Shah on the throne, and demanded high positions in his court. Mubarak Khan had them beheaded instead.

Mubarak Shah attributed his rise to power to the divine will. He once asked his courtiers if any of them had expected him to become the king. When they replied in negative, he declared that Allah had made him the king, and only Allah could remove him from that position. He assumed the title Khalifatullah ("Representative of God"), which appears on his coins.

== Policies ==
To win popular support, Mubarak Shah revoked several of Alauddin's decisions:

- Alauddin had ordered imprisonment of around 17,000-18,000 officers for a variety of reasons, including corruption and political offences. Mubarak Shah ordered the release of all these prisoners, who remained grateful to him.
- During the last years of his reign, Alauddin had stopped receiving public petitions. Mubarak Shah revived the petition system, and very often, issued orders favouring the petitioners.
- Alauddin's administration had incorporated a number of private lands in the crown territory (khalisa). Mubarak Shah reinstated these lands to their private owners.
- Mubarak Shah abolished severe fines and taxes, and prohibited the revenue ministry from using harsh measures such as flogging and imprisonment to recover taxes.
  - The lower land taxes improved the conditions of the landholders and the peasants. Ziauddin Barani, an orthodox Muslim, lamented that the Hindus (agriculturalists) who had been reduced to destitution during Alauddin's reign, now wore fine clothes and rode on horses.
- He also revoked Alauddin's price-control measures, leading to increased inflation.
  - The prices of grains and commodities rose substantially. According to Barani, the Multani merchants rejoiced at Alauddin's death, and now openly resorted to profiteering.
  - The price of beautiful slave girls, eunuchs and young boys rose to 500 tankas, and sometimes, as high as 2,000 tankas. Besides inflation, the high demand was also a factor in this price increase: the new Sultan was fond of sensual pleasures, and the general public followed suit.
  - The average wages increased four-fold. The annual pay of servants increased from 10-12 tankas to as high as 100 tankas.
- Mubarak Shah rewarded the army soldiers with an amount equal to six months of salary, and increased the officers' allowances and stipends.
- He also increased the grants to the Sayyids and the ulama.
- Mubarak Shah continued Alauddin's prohibition on intoxicants, but the implementation was lenient, and liquor was brought into the city.

== Military career ==
=== Suppression of rebellion in Gujarat ===
Before his death, Malik Kafur had conspired to kill Alp Khan, the governor of Gujarat. Because of this, the Sultanate's army in Gujarat, led by Haidar and Zirak, had revolted. Kafur had dispatched the Devagiri governor Ayn al-Mulk Multani to suppress the rebellion. During his march to Gujarat, near Chittor, Multani received the news that Kafur had been killed. His officers then decided to abandon the march until further orders from Delhi.

After ascending the throne, Mubarak Shah sent Malik Tughluq to Multani's camp, asking him to continue the march to Gujarat. However, Multani's officers suggested waiting for 1-2 months before implementing the orders, as they had not seen the new Sultan, and were not convinced that his rule would be stable. Tughluq determined that the dissenting officers wanted their posts to be guaranteed under the new regime. Therefore, he marched back to Delhi, and advised Mubarak Shah to send each officer a firman (letter of authority) and a khilat (robe of honour). The Sultan agreed, and when Malik Tughluq returned to Chittor, the officers agreed to continue their march to Gujarat. Tughluq led the vanguard, while Multani held the supreme command of the army.

Multani convinced most of the rebels to join his forces. Haidar, Zirak and their supporters had to flee Gujarat. Mubarak Shah then appointed his father-in-law Malik Dinar Zafar Khan as the governor of Gujarat. The new governor compromised with the Hindu chiefs, and governed the province well. He collected a large sum of money from the chiefs and landholders of Gujarat, and sent it to Delhi.

In his second regnal year, Mubarak Shah executed Zafar Khan for unknown reasons, and appointed his homosexual partner Husamuddin as the governor of Gujarat. After Husamuddin was deposed by the local umara for apostacy, Mubarak Shah appointed Wahiduddin Quraishi as the new governor of Gujarat. Quraishi was also given the title Sadrul Mulk. After Ayn al-Mulk Multani was sent to govern Devagiri, Quraishi was recalled to Delhi, and appointed wazir with the title Tajul Mulk.

=== Devagiri expedition ===
Khalji territory (dark green) after the annexation of the Yadava kingdom, with the territories of the Khalji tributaries (light green)

The Yadava kingdom, with its capital at Devagiri in the Deccan region, had become a tributary state to Delhi during Alauddin's reign. Alauddin had decided against annexing the Deccan kingdoms to his empire, because of the difficulty of controlling and governing these distant territories remotely from Delhi. However, after the rebellion of the last Yadava tributary Bhillama, his general Malik Kafur had taken charge of Devagiri, and had received letters of submission from the various chiefs. After Malik Kafur was recalled to Delhi, Ayn al-Mulk Multani acted as the governor of Devagiri, but later, he too was recalled to crush a rebellion in Gujarat.

Taking advantage of this, the Yadavas seized Devagiri, and declared their independence. They were led by Harapaladeva (or Hirpal), who was probably a son-in-law of the former Yadava monarch Ramachandra, and his prime minister Raghava (or Raghu).

Mubarak Shah wanted to recapture Devagiri immediately after his ascension, but his counsellors had advised him against attempting to do so without consolidating his rule in Delhi first. In April 1317, during the second year of his reign, Mubarak Shah marched to Devagiri with a large army. Before leaving Delhi, he assigned the administration to his father-in-law Shahin with the title Vafa Malik.

Mubarak Shah followed the well-known route to Devagiri, assembling his forces at Tilpat near Delhi, and then marching to Devagiri in around two months. When the army reached Devagiri, all the local chiefs except Raghava and Harapaladeva accepted Mubarak Shah's suzerainty without offering any resistance.

Raghava and his nearly 10,000-strong cavalry, as well as Harapaladeva, fled to the hilly region near Devagiri. The Delhi generals Khusrau Khan and Malik Qutlugh (who held the title amir-i shikar) led an army to pursue them. The Delhi forces completely routed Raghava's army. Khusrau Khan dispatched a force led by amir-i koh Malik Ikhtiyaruddin Talbagha (son of Yaghda) to pursue Harapaladeva, who was wounded and captured after 2-3 skirmishes. Harapaladeva was presented before Mubarak Shah, who ordered his beheading. The body of Harapaladeva was hung at the gates of Devagiri.

Mubarak Shah spent some time consolidating his rule in Deccan. Malik Yaklakhi, who had served as Alauddin's Naib-i-Barid-i-Mumalik, was appointed as the governor of Devagiri.

=== Siege of Warangal ===
The Kakatiya kingdom, with its capital at Warangal, was another kingdom tributary to Alauddin. However, the Kakatiya ruler Prataparudra had stopped making tribute payments to Delhi. Therefore, Mubarak Shah sent an army to subjugate him. The army was led by Khusrau Khan, Khwaja Haji (who had served as Alauddin's minister of war), and Malik Qutlugh (amir-i shikar). The Delhi army besieged the Kakatiya capital Warangal, and Prataparudra decided to negotiate truce after putting up some resistance. He surrendered a huge amount of wealth to the invaders, and agreed to make regular tribute payments.

After subduing the Kakatiyas, Khusrau Khan marched to Ellora, where Mubarak Shah had been residing for a month. The rest of the army joined him on the banks of the Narmada River on his way back to Delhi.

== Personal life ==
Mubarak Shah was bisexual. His harem had a large number of women, many of which accompanied him on his campaigns. After killing his brother Khizr Khan, he took the latter's widow Deval into his own harem. According to the 16th-century historian Firishta, who calls Mubarak Shah "a monster in the shape of man", Mubarak Shah used to parade naked prostitutes on the terraces of his palaces and make them urinate on the nobles entering his court.

Mubarak Shah also had homosexual relations with two uterine brothers, Hasan (later Khusrau Khan) and Husamuddin (or Hisamuddin). According to Amir Khusrau's Tughluq Nama, the two brothers belonged to a Hindu military caste called Baradu. They had been captured during Ayn al-Mulk Multani-led 1305 conquest of Malwa. They were brought as slaves to Delhi, where they were brought up by Alauddin's naib-i khas-i hajib Malik Shadi. The two brothers acted as passive homosexuals only to maintain their status and position. Mubarak Shah appointed Husamuddin as the governor of Gujarat, after executing the former governor Malik Dinar Zafar Khan for no apparent reason. Husamuddin later became an apostate (from Islam), because of which the umara of Gujarat arrested him, and sent him to Delhi in chains. Mubarak Shah merely slapped him, and gave him a high position in the royal court.

Mubarak Shah preferred Hasan as a partner, but turned to Husamuddin whenever Hasan was not available. Their relationship was not a secret, and Mubarak and Hasan used to exchange hugs and kisses in public. Mubarak gave Hasan the title Khusrau Khan, several iqta, the army of the deceased Malik Kafur, and the wizarat. According to the chronicler Barani, Mubarak became "so enamored by Hasan ... that he did not want to be parted from him for a moment." Barani further states that Hasan resented "the way the Sultan forced himself upon him and took advantage of him", and secretly planned revenge against him. Mubarak's other subordinates warned him about Khusrau's treacherous plans, but while being sodomized by the Sultan, Khusrau convinced him that the accusers were falsely slandering him. Mubarak was ultimately killed by Khusrau Khan's accomplices.

== Death ==
Khusrau Khan convinced Mubarak Shah to allow him to raise an army of Baradu Hindus by arguing that all other nobles (maliks) had their own groups of followers. He enlisted several soldiers at Bahilwal (near Mount Abu and in the province of Gujarat. According to Tughluq Nama, this army included 10,000 Baradu horsemen, and was commanded by several Hindu chiefs (rais and ranas).

Next, Khusrau Khan contacted officers who resented Sultan Mubarak Shah. Bahauddin, a dabir who had quarreled with the Sultan over a woman, joined the Baradu coinspiracy. Yusuf Sahi, Shaista (son of Muhammad Qirrat Qamar), and some other officers also joined Khusrau Khan. Initially, the Baradus planned to kill the Sultan during a hunting expedition in Sirsawah, but Yusuf Sahi and his colleagues opposed the plan arguing that the Sultan's army would kill the conspirators in an open field. Instead, they suggested killing the Sultan in the royal Hazar Sutun palace, and capturing all the nobles at the palace. Khusrau Khan then told the Sultan that he wanted his men to be granted access to the palace, so that they could meet him without requiring him to leave the Sultan's company. The Sultan obliged, and subsequently, every night 300-400 Baradus started entering the palace. They assembled in the former chambers of Malik Kafur on the ground floor of the palace, which had been assigned to Khusrau Khan.

On 7 May 1320, Qazi Ziyauddin, a teacher of the Sultan, suggested an investigation into the assembly of the Baradus. However, the Sultan angrily dismissed the suggestion, and none of the nobles dared to make a similar suggestion. Barani claims when the Sultan told Khusrau Khan about Qazi Ziyauddin's suggestion, Khusrau khan won over his confidence by making love with him.

On the night of 9 July 1320, Qazi Ziyauddin visited the ground floor of the palace to supervise the palace guard. Randhol, the maternal uncle of Khusrau Khan, entered the palace with a large number of Baradus, who hid daggers under their clothes. When Ziyauddin let his guard down to accept a paan (betel leaf preparation) from Randhol, the Baradu leader Jaharya stabbed him to death. The Sultan, who was in the company of Khusrau Khan on the upper floor, heard the commotion caused by Ziyauddin's murder. However, Khusrau Khan told him that the royal horses had broken loose, and the noise was caused by the guards trying to catch the animals. Meanwhile, Jaharya and other Baradus entered the upper floor, and killed the Sultan's special guards - Ibrahim and Ishaq. The Sultan now realized that a rebellion was happening against him, and tried to escape to his harem, which was located a floor above. However, Khusrau Khan stopped him by seizing his hair. The Sultan knocked Khusrau Khan to the ground, and sat on his chest, but Khusrau Khan did not let go of his hair. Meanwhile, Jaharya arrived at the scene, stuck a patta (axe) at the Sultan's chest, lifted him up by his hair, and threw him to the ground. He then beheaded the Sultan, and the head was later thrown in the courtyard on the ground floor. The royal guards fled to save their lives, as a large number of Baradus started massacring the palace residents.

Legend says that Mubarak Shah did not like the famous Sufi saint Nizamuddin Auliya, because Khizr Khan - the brother whom Mubarak Shah put to death - was a disciple of the saint. Mubarak Shah started patronizing the rival saint Shaikhzada Jam, but Shaikhzada Jam did not become as reputed as Nizamuddin Auliya. Mubarak Shah then tried to prop up Shaikh Ruknuddin of Multan as a rival to Nizamuddin by declaring that he would personally consider all the petitions passed to him through the saint. However, Ruknuddin did not emerge as a rival of Nizamuddin either. Nizamuddin met and saluted Mubarak Shah at a Quran-reading ceremony (siyyum) after the death of Shaikh Ziyauddin Rumi, but Mubarak Shah did not acknowledge the salutation. Subsequently, he announced a reward of 1,000 tankas (coins) for anyone who brought him the head of Nizamuddin. When Mubarak Shah constructed a jama masjid called Masjid-i-Miri and asked all Muslim scholars (ulama) and mystics to assemble there for the Friday prayers, Nizamuddin refused to oblige, declaring that he would visit the mosque closest to his home instead. In June-July 1320, when the notable people of Delhi visited the Sultan to greet him on the beginning of a new lunar month (Jamadi), Nizamuddin sent his servant-disciple instead of personally visiting the Sultan. Mubarak then declared that if Nizamuddin did not visit him personally at the beginning of the next lunar month, he would compel the saint to do so via an executive order. Nizamuddin did not respond and instead prayed at his mother's grave. At the beginning of the next month (1 Jamadi II), Mubarak Shah was killed. The Baradus killed or blinded the other surviving sons of Alauddin to eliminate Khalji claims to the throne, and also killed Mubarak Shah's mother Jhatyapali.

Sultan Qutbuddin Mubarak Shah had at least one daughter, who married a later sultan of Delhi, Firuz Shah Tughlaq.

== Popular culture ==
Season 7, Episode 8 of the Bad Gays podcast covers Mubarak Shah's life.
