= Shihabuddin Omar =

Sultan of Delhi in 1316

Shihabuddin Omar Khalji

14th Sultan of Delhi
- Reign: 5 January – 14 April 1316
- Predecessor: Alauddin Khalji
- Successor: Qutbuddin Mubarak Shah
- Born: 1310 or 1311
- Died: 1316 (aged 3–5); Gwalior, Delhi Sultanate (present-day Madhya Pradesh, India)
Regnal name
- Al-Sultan al-Azam Shihab ud-Dunya Wa'l-Din Abu'l Muzaffar Omar Shah al-Sultan (Note: السلطان الاعظم شہاب الدنیا والالدین ابو المظفر عمر شاہ السلطان)
- Dynasty: Khalji dynasty
- Father: Alauddin Khalji
- Mother: Jhatyapali
- Religion: Sunni Islam

Shihab-ud-Din Omar (1310/1311–1316) was the third Sultan of the Khalji dynasty and fourteenth Sultan of Delhi Sultanate in India. After the death of his father Alauddin Khalji in 1316, he ascended the throne as a toddler, with the support of Alauddin's slave-general Malik Kafur. His brother Qutb-ud-din Mubarak became the regent after the assassination of Kafur and subsequently dethroned him to become the Sultan.

== Early life ==
According to the 14th-century chronicler Isami, Shihab-ud-Din was Alauddin's son from Jhatyapali, the daughter of Alauddin's Yadava feudatory Ramachandra.

== Ascension to the throne ==
Alauddin fell seriously ill during his last years, and the administration was controlled by his slave-general Malik Kafur. After Alauddin's original heir apparent Khizr Khan was imprisoned at Gwalior for allegedly conspiring to kill him, Malik Kafur convened a meeting of important officers at Alauddin's bedside. It was decided at this meeting that Shihabuddin would succeed Alauddin, with Malik Kafur as the regent. According to Isami, Alauddin was too weak to say anything during the meeting, but all the attendees agreed that his silence should be interpreted as his consent. At this time, Shihabuddin was a little over six years of age.

The day after Alauddin's death on the night of 3–4 January 1316, Kafur convened a meeting of important officers (maliks and umara), and appointed Shihabuddin as the new Sultan. He read Alauddin's order according to which the deceased Sultan had disinherited his eldest son Khizr Khan and appointed Shihabuddin as his successor. The other sons of Alauddin - Mubarak Khan, Shadi Khan, Farid Khan, Osman Khan, Mustafa Khan, Muhammad Khan and Abu Bakr Khan - were ordered to kiss Shihabuddin's feet.

== Reign ==
Shibabuddin's complete title was "al-sultan al-azam shihab al-dunya wa'l din abu'l muzaffar umar shah al-sultan".

During Kafur's short regency, Shihabuddin's participation in governance was limited to his appearance in a short court ceremony that was held daily by Kafur. After the ceremony, Kafur would send Shihabuddin to his mother and hold separate meetings to issue orders to the various officers.

To maintain his control over the throne, Kafur had Alauddin's sons Khizr Khan and Shadi Khan blinded. He also imprisoned Alauddin's senior queen Malika-i Jahan and Mubarak Shah, another adult son of Alauddin. According to the 16th-century historian Firishta, Kafur married Alauddin's widow Jhatyapalli, the mother of Shihabuddin. Becoming the new Sultan's step-father was probably Kafur's way of legitimizing his power.

The former bodyguards (paiks) of Alauddin disapproved of Kafur's actions against the family of their deceased master, and murdered Kafur. Kafur's killers freed Mubarak Shah, who was appointed first as the regent. In April 1316, Mubarak Shah detained Shibabuddin, and became the Sultan. Shibabuddin was moved to Gwalior, where he died the same year.
