= Alai Darwaza =

Mosque gateway in Delhi, India

- علائی دروازه (Urdu)
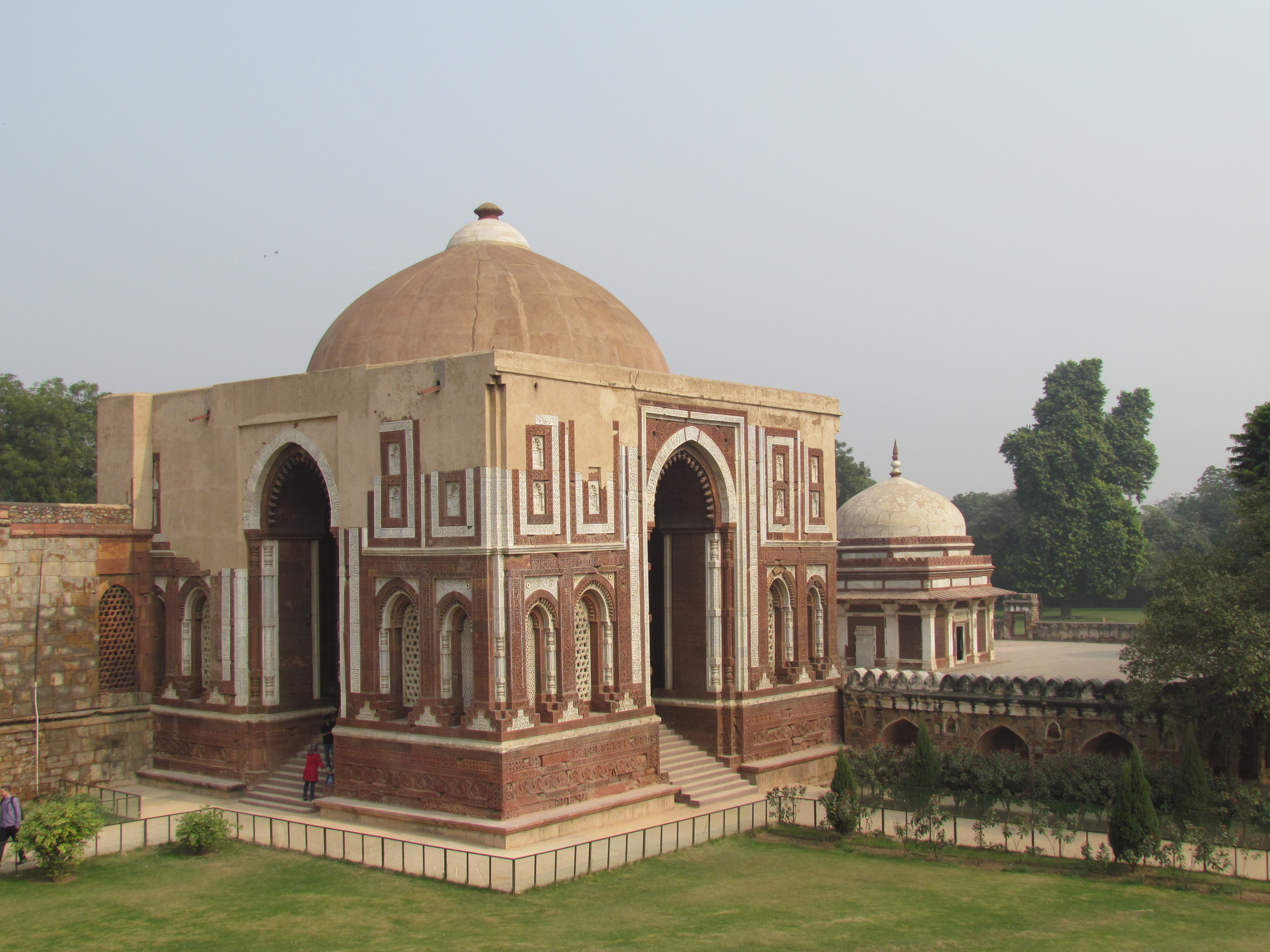
- Alai Darwaza

- Location within Delhi
- 28.5242°N 77.1857°E
- Location: Qutb Minar complex, Delhi, India

History
- Built: 1311; 715 years ago

UNESCO World Heritage Site
- Type: Cultural
- Criteria: iv
- Designated: 1993 (17th session)
- Part of: Qutb Minar and its monuments
- Region: India

The Ala'i Darwaza (Urdu: علائی دروازه, lit. 'Gate of Alauddin') is the southern gateway of the Quwwat-ul-Islam Mosque in Qutb complex, Mehrauli, Delhi, India. Built by Sultan Alauddin Khalji in 1311 and made of red sandstone, it is a square domed gatehouse with arched entrances and houses a single chamber.

It has a special significance in Indo-Islamic architecture as the first Indian monument to be built using Islamic methods of construction and ornamentation and is a World Heritage Site.

== Background ==
The Alai Darwaza was built by Delhi Sultan Alauddin Khalji of the Khalji dynasty in 1311. It was a part of his plan to extend the Quwwat-ul-Islam Mosque on four sides. Although he planned to construct four gates, only the Alai Darwaza could be completed, as he died in 1316. It serves as the southern gateway of the mosque. It is located approximately at the southern part of the Qutb complex.

In 1993, the Darwaza and the other monuments of the complex were designated a World Heritage Site. The surroundings of Qutb Minar including many tombs, the mosque, and the Iron Pillar is called Qutb Complex.

== Architecture ==
The Alai Darwaza is made up of a single hall whose interior part measures 34.5 feet (10.5 m) and exterior part measures 56.5 feet (17.2 m). It is 60 feet (18 m) tall and the walls are 11 feet (3.4 m) thick.

The gatehouse, from 1311, still shows a cautious approach to the new technology, with very thick walls and a shallow dome, only visible from a certain distance or height. Bold contrasting colors of masonry, with red sandstone and white marble, introduce what was to become a common feature of Indo-Islamic architecture, substituting for the polychrome tiles used in Persia and Central Asia. The pointed arches come together slightly at their base, giving a mild horseshoe arch effect, and their internal edges are not cusped but lined with conventionalized "spearhead" projections, possibly representing lotus buds. Net, stone openwork screens, are introduced here; they already had been long used in temples.

The height of the dome is 47 feet (14 m). It is the first true dome built in India, as previous attempts to construct a true dome were not successful.

The entire Darwaza is made up of red sandstone with white colored marbles inlaid on the exterior walls. There is extensive Arabic calligraphy on the walls of the Darwaza. The arches are horseshoe shaped, the first time such arches were used in India. The façade has pre-Turkish carvings and patterns. The windows have marble lattices. The surface decoration consists of interweaved floral tendrils and is repeated with symmetry on three doorways.

== Gallery ==
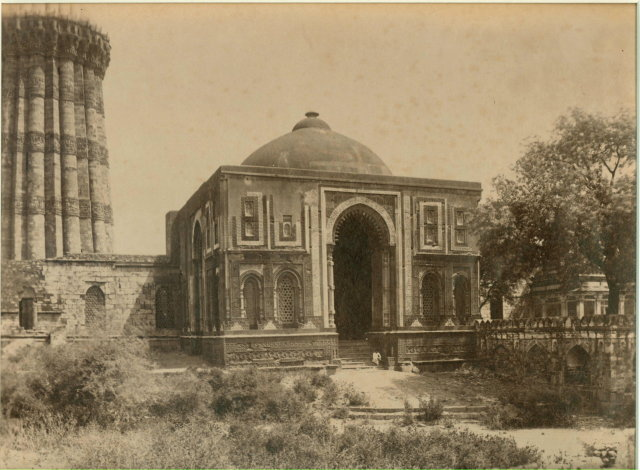
Alai Darwaza in the 1870s

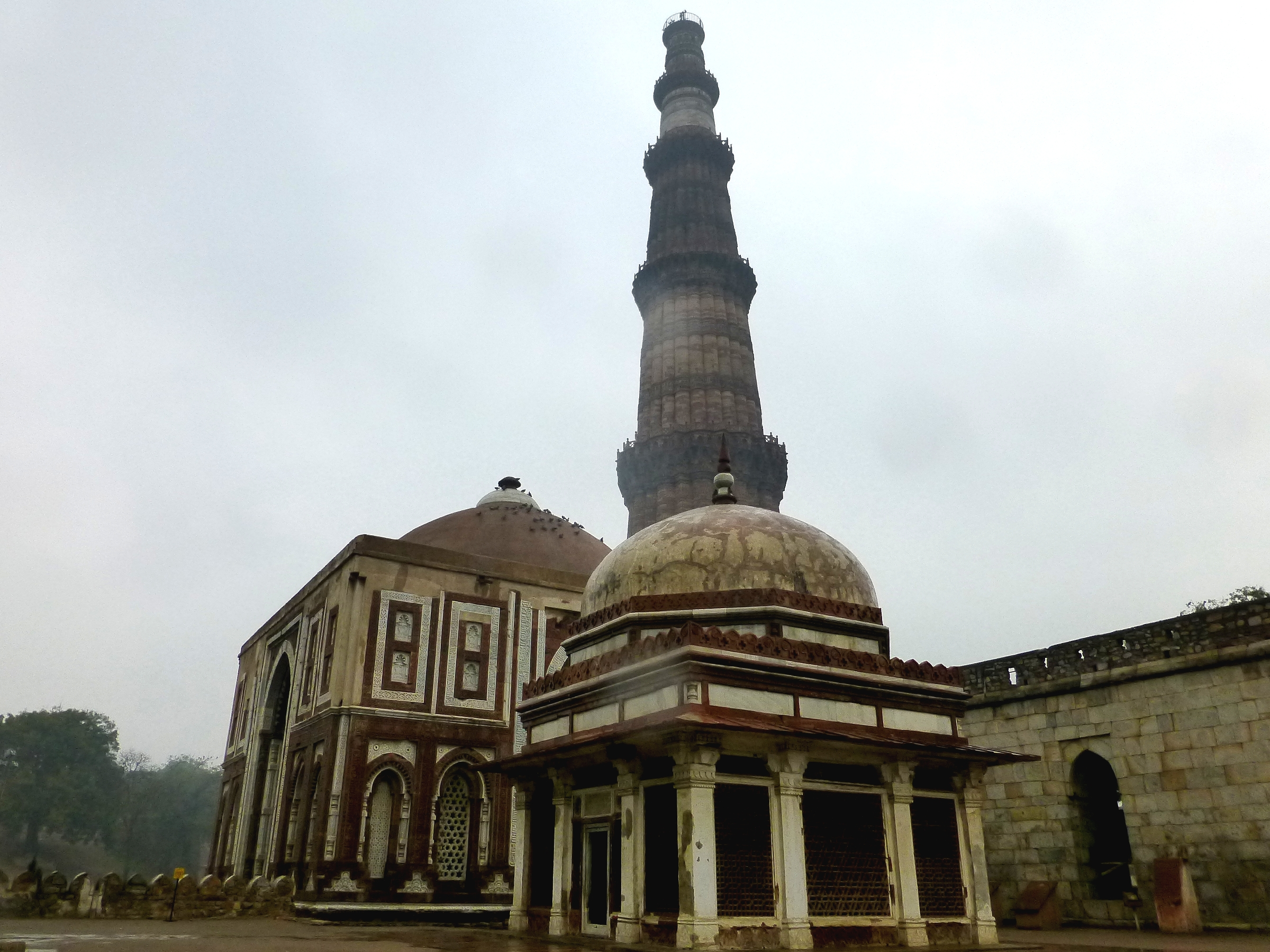
Alai Darwaza with the Tomb of Imam Zamin in the foreground

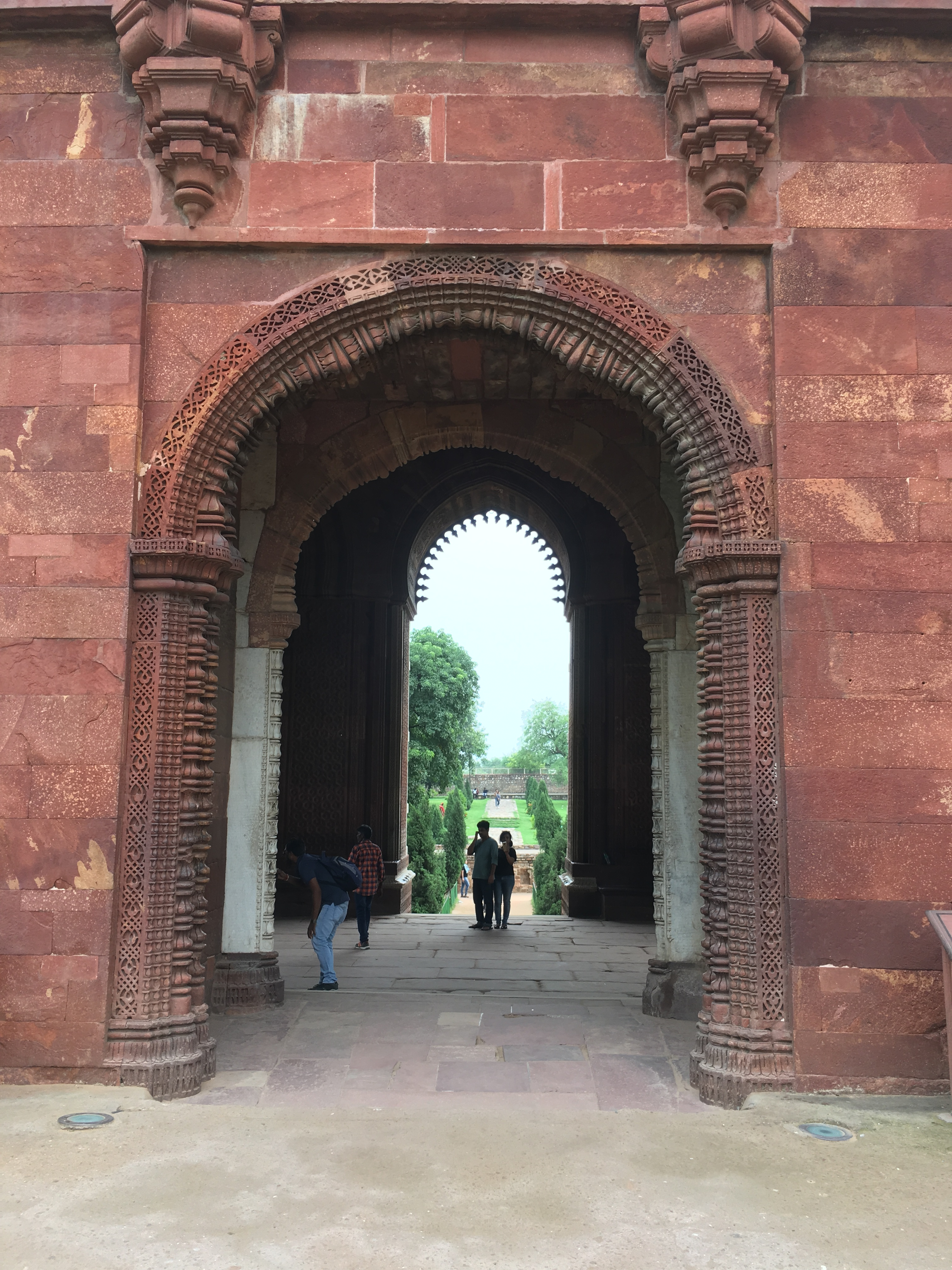
Doorway of the Darwaza

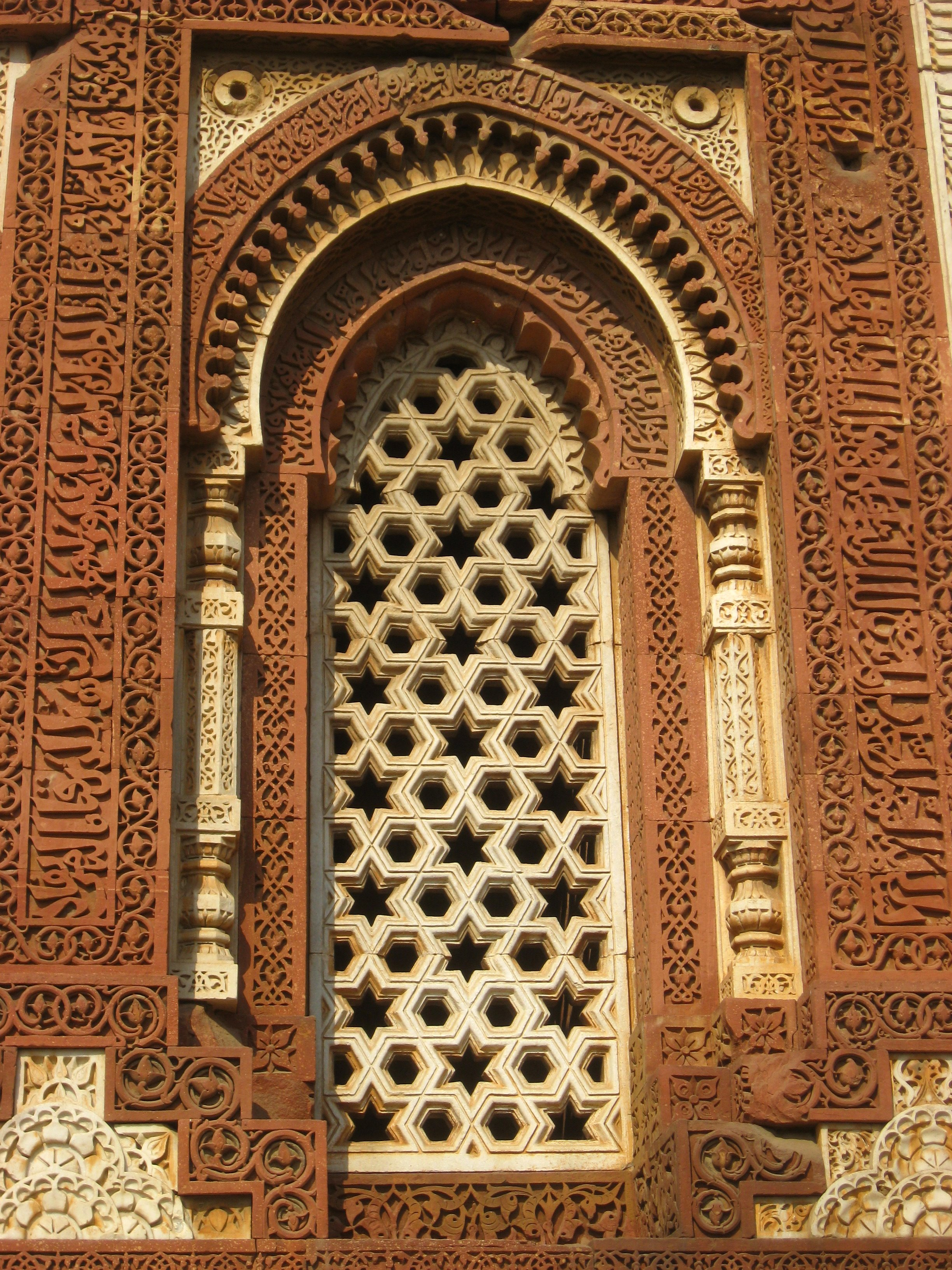
Window of the Darwaza
