= Khalji dynasty =

1290–1320 Turco-Afghan dynasty of the Delhi Sultanate

Khalji خلجي
- 1290–1320
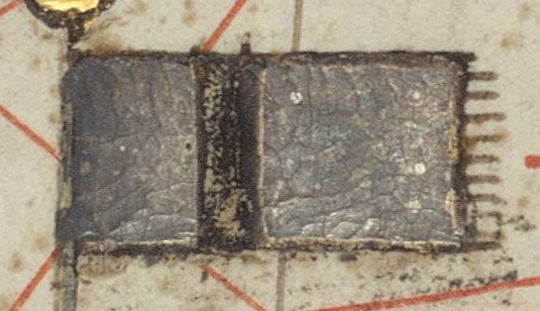
- Flag of the Delhi Sultanate according to the contemporary Catalan Atlas (c. 1375). (Note: Grey flag with black vertical stripe according to the Catalan Atlas (c. 1375): in the depiction of the Delhi Sultanate in the Catalan Atlas)

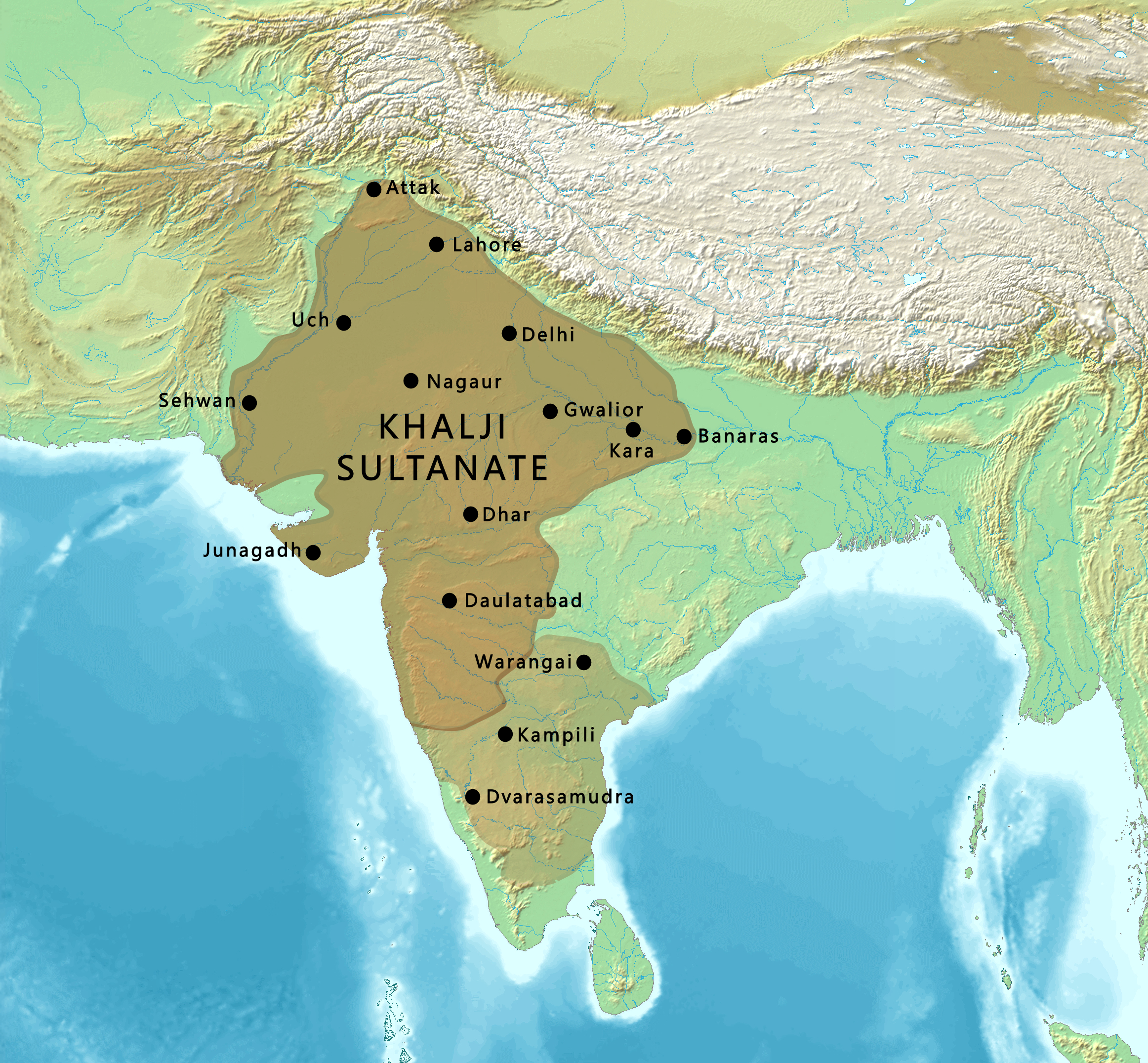
- Khalji dynasty (South Asia) Territory controlled by the Khaljis circa 1320.
- Capital: Delhi; Kilokhri (Kilokari) (Present: Part of Jungpura, South East Delhi district; nearby Humayun's tomb)
- Common languages: Hindavi (lingua franca); Persian (official)
- Religion: Sunni Islam
- Government: Sultanate
- Sultan
  - 1290–1296: Jalal ud din Firuz Khalji (first)
  - 1296–1316: Alauddin Khalji (second)
  - 1316: Shihab-ud-din Omar (third)
  - 1316–1320: Qutb ad-Din Mubarak (fourth & last)
- History
  - Khalji Revolution: 13 June 1290
  - Disestablished: 1 May 1320
Preceded by
Mamluk dynasty of Delhi
Vaghela dynasty
Seuna (Yadava) dynasty
Succeeded by
Tughlaq dynasty
- Today part of: India; Pakistan

The Khalji or Khilji dynasty (Note: In medieval Persian manuscripts, the word can be read as either "Khalji" or "Khilji" because of the omission of short vowel signs in orthography, but "Khalji" is the correct name.) was the second ruling house of the Delhi Sultanate, covering large parts of the Indian subcontinent for nearly three decades between 1290 and 1320. Founded by Jalal-ud-Din Khalji, it is best known for the reign of Alauddin Khalji, under whom the Sultanate reached its greatest territorial extent and underwent significant military, administrative, and economic reforms.

== Origins ==
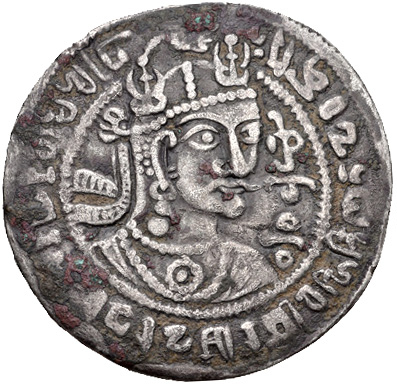
Coin of Tegin Shah, described as "Iltäbar (sub-King) of the Khalaj", dated to the year 728 CE.

The Khalji dynasty was of Turko-Afghan origin whose ancestors, the Khalaj, are said to have been initially a Turkic people who migrated together with the Hunas and Hephthalites from Central Asia, into the southern and eastern regions of modern-day Afghanistan as early as 660 CE, where they ruled the region of Kabul as the Buddhist Turk Shahis. According to R.S. Chaurasia, the Khaljis slowly inherited many Afghan habits and customs, and that they were treated as Afghans by the Turkic nobles of the Delhi Sultanate. Even to the point where Turkic nobles in the Delhi Sultanate opposed Jalal-ud-din's ascension to the throne of Delhi after the Khalji Revolution.

According to The New Cambridge History of Islam in the thirteenth century the Khalji were regarded as a separate people distinct from the Turks. The so-called “Khalji revolution” was the transfer of power from a Turkish ruling elite to a non-Turkish one. André Wink however, states that Khaljis were a Turkicized group and remnants of early Indo-European nomads such as Kushans, Hephthalites, and Sakas who later merged with the Afghans. Also, stating that "at that time they were not perceived as Turks or Mongols. Contemporary historians clearly distinguish the Khaljis from the Turks" The Khalaj are, according to Doerfer, perhaps of Sogdians who were Turkicized. These Khalaj were later Afghanized and are believed to be the ancestors of Ghilzai/Ghilji Pashtuns.

According to C. E. Bosworth, the Ghilzai, who make up the majority of the Pashtuns in Afghanistan, are the modern result of the Khalaj assimilation into the Pashtuns. Between the 10th and 13th centuries, some sources refer to the Khalaj people as of Turkic, but some others do not. Minorsky argues that the early history of the Khalaj tribe is obscure and adds that the identity of the name Khalaj is still to be proved. Mahmud al-Kashgari (11th century) does not include the Khalaj among the Oghuz Turkic tribes, but includes them among the Oghuz-Turkman (where Turkman meant "Like the Turks") tribes. Kashgari felt the Khalaj did not belong to the original stock of Turkish tribes but had associated with them and therefore, in language and dress, often appeared "like Turks". Muhammad ibn Najib Bakran's Jahan-nama explicitly describes them as Turkic, although he notes that their complexion had become darker (compared to the Turks) and their language had undergone enough alterations to become a distinct dialect. However, the Jahan-nama describes them as "tribe of Turks" going through a language shift, speaking the Khalaj dialect, which was summarized by V. Minorsky.

== History ==
=== Jalal-ud-din Khalji ===
The Delhi Sultanate and main Asian polities circa 1300. Mongol forces, especially the Chagatai Khanate, kept threatening the northwestern border.

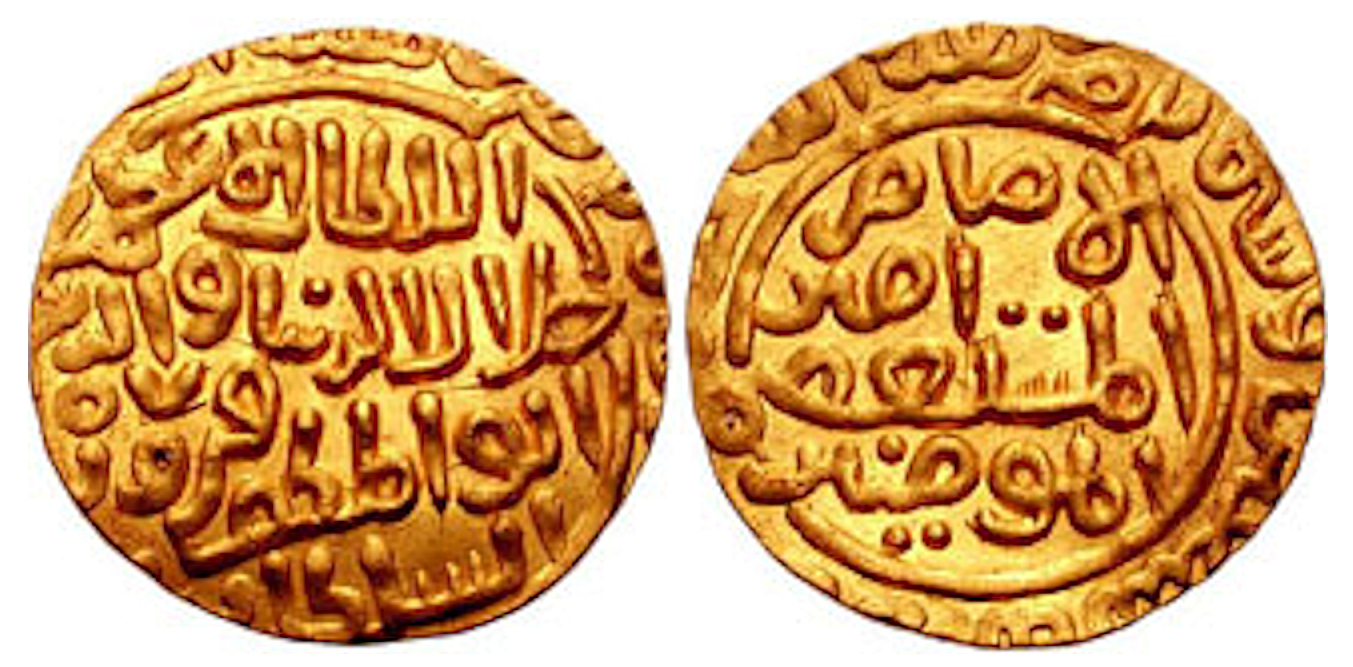
Coinage of Jalaluddin Firuz Khalji. Delhi mint. Dated AH 691 (1291-2 AD). Legend citing the caliph Al-Musta'sim.

Khaljis were vassals of the Mamluk dynasty of Delhi and served the Sultan of Delhi, Ghiyas ud din Balban, as a minor part of the Muslim nobility. The last major Turkic ruler, Balban, in his struggle to maintain power over his insubordinate Turkish officers, destroyed the power of the Forty. However this indirectly damaged the Turkish integrity of the nobility, which had opposed the power of the non-Turks. This left them vulnerable to the Khalji faction, which took power through a series of assassinations. One by one the Mamluk officers were murdered, and the last ruler of the Turkic Mamluk dynasty - the 17-year old Muiz ud din Qaiqabad - was killed in the Kailu-gheri Palace during the coup known as the Khalji Revolution by Jalal ud din Firuz Khalji.

Jalaluddin Firuz Khalji, who was around 70 years old at the time of his ascension, was known as a mild-mannered, humble and kind monarch to the general populace.

Jalaluddin succeeded in overcoming the opposition of the Turkish nobles and ascended the throne of Delhi in January 1290. Jalal-ud-din was not universally accepted: during his six-year reign (1290–96), Balban's nephew revolted due to his assumption of power and the subsequent sidelining of nobility and commanders serving the Mamluk sultanate. Jalal-ud-din suppressed the revolt and executed some commanders, then led an unsuccessful expedition against Ranthambhor. Jalal-ud-din used an Afghan enclave in the suburb of Delhi, Kilokhri, as his de facto capital.

He also repelled several Mongol attacks on India and was successful in destroying a Mongol force on the banks of the Sind River in central India with the help of his nephew Juna Khan.

In a plot by his nephew, Jalaluddin was assassinated by Muhammad Salim of Samana, Punjab.

=== Alauddin Khalji ===
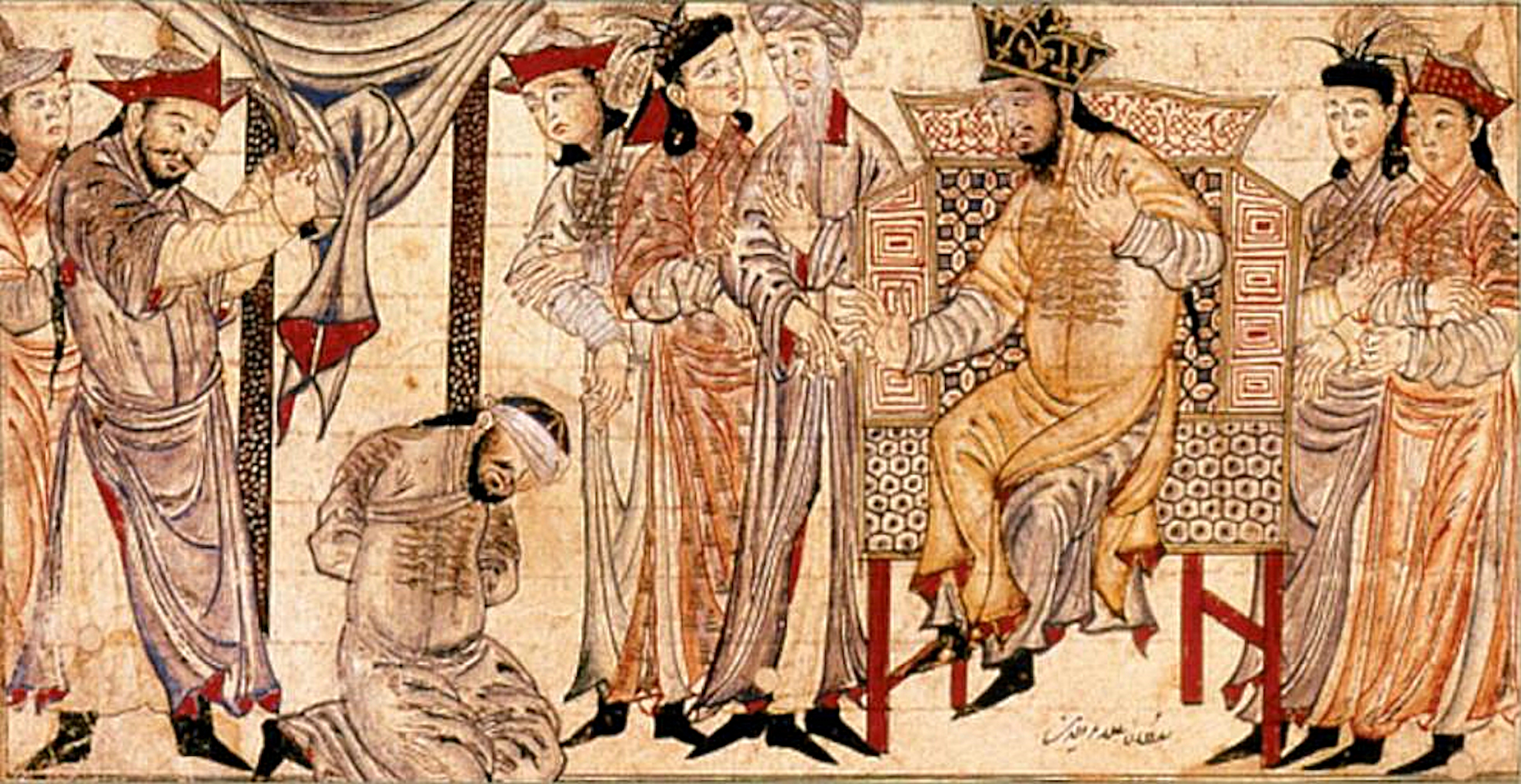
The execution of Jalal-ud-Din Khalji (r 1290-96), with the usurper Alauddin Khalji enthroned. Jami al-Tawarikh (1314 painting)

Alauddin Khalji was the nephew and son-in-law of Jalal-ud-din. He raided the Deccan peninsula and Deogiri - then the capital of the state of Maharashtra, looting their treasure. He returned to Delhi in 1296, murdered Jalal-ud-din and assumed power as Sultan. He would appoint his allies such as Zafar Khan (Minister of War), Nusrat Khan (Wazir of Delhi), Ayn al-Mulk Multani, Malik Kafur, Malik Tughlaq, and Malik Nayk (Master of the Horse).

At the beginning of his reign, Alauddin defeated a major Mongol invasion, at the Battle of Jaran-Manjur in 1298. The victory consolidated Alauddin's power and prestige, thus stabilizing his position on the throne of Delhi.

To secure a route to Gujarat's trading ports, Ayn al-Mulk Multani was sent to conquer the Paramara kingdom of Malwa. Its Rai defended it with a large Rajput army, but he was defeated by Multani who became the governor of the province.

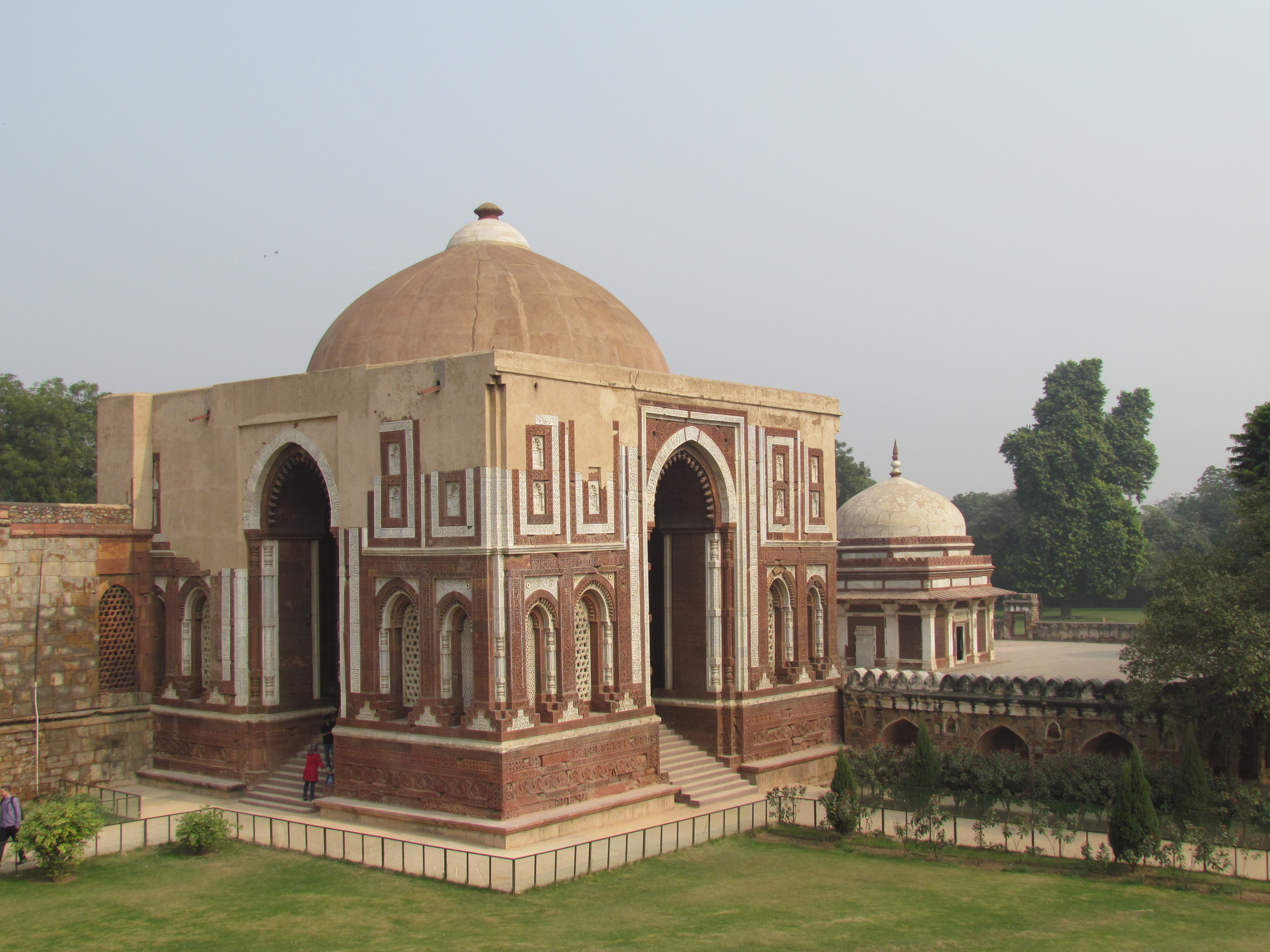
The Alai Darwaza, completed in 1311 during the Khalji dynasty.

Then in 1299 Nusrat Khan was sent to conquer Gujarat itself, where he defeated its Solanki king. Nusrat Khan plundered its chief cities and sacked its temples, such as the famous temple of Somnath which had been rebuilt in the twelfth century. It was here where Nusrat Khan captured Malik Kafur who would later become a military general. Alauddin continued expanding Delhi Sultanate into South India, with the help of generals such as Malik Kafur and Khusraw Khan, collecting large war booty (Anwatan) from those they defeated. His commanders collected war spoils from conquered kingdoms and paid khums (one fifth) on ghanima (booty collected during war) to Sultan's treasury, which helped strengthen the Khalji rule.

Alauddin Khalji reigned for 20 years. He conquered Rajputana, attacking and seizing the states of Jaisalmer (1299), Ranthambhor (1301), Chittorgarh (1303), Malwa(1305), he also conquered Gujarat and plundered the wealthy state of Devagiri during his raids in the south. He also withstood two Mongol raids.

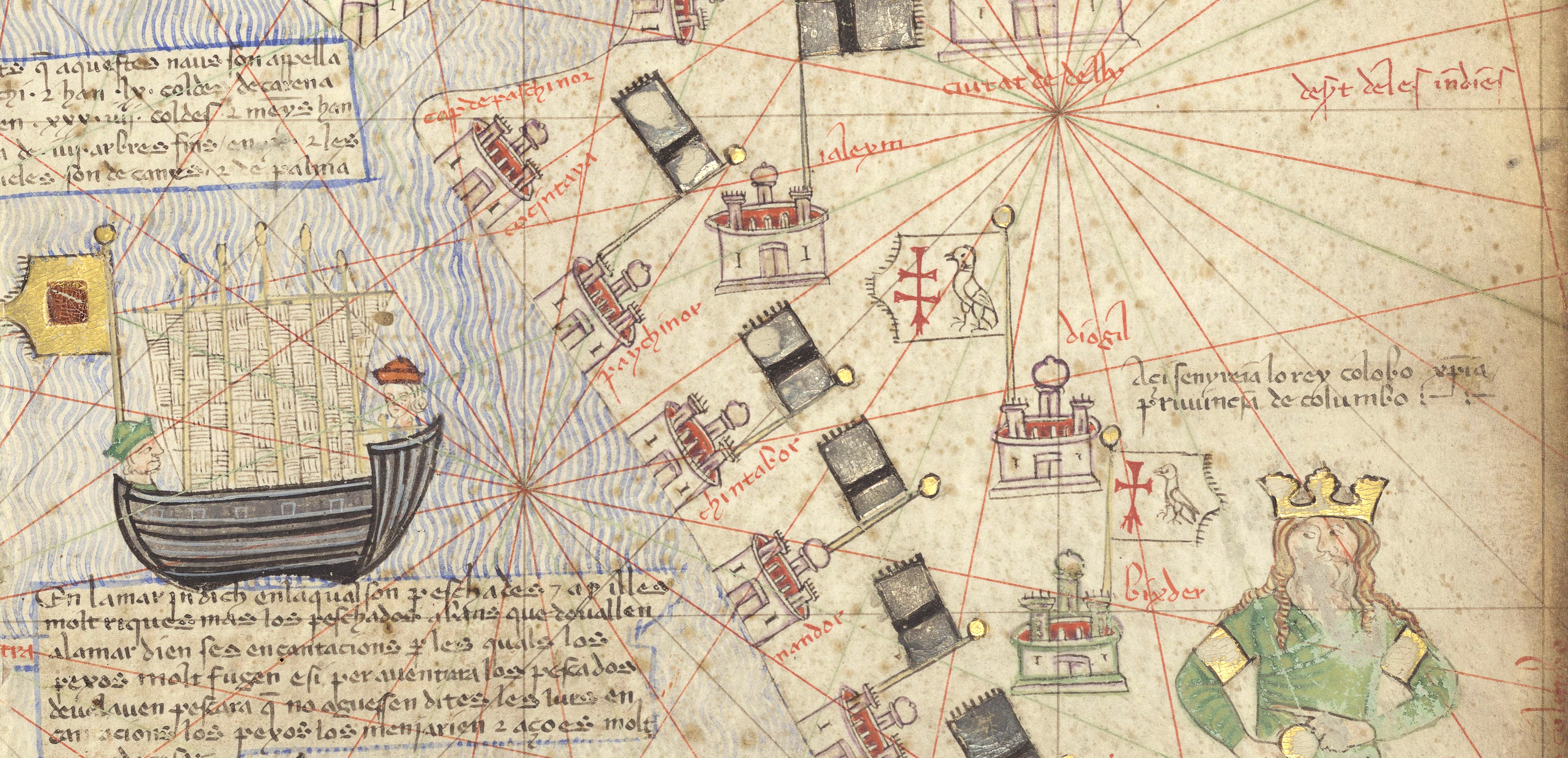
Western coast of India, with the traditional Yadava capital of Diogil ("Deogiri", or Devagiri) at the center, in the Catalan Atlas (1375). On top of the city of Diogil floats a peculiar flag, while coastal cities are under the black flag of the Delhi Sultanate. Devagiri was ultimately captured by Alauddin Khalji in 1307. The trading ship raises the flag of the Ilkhanate.

Alauddin was also known for his cruelty against attacked kingdoms after wars. Historians note him as a tyrant, and that anyone Alauddin Khalji suspected of being a threat to this power was killed, along with the women and children of that family. In 1298, between 15,000 and 30,000 people near Delhi, who had recently converted to Islam, were slaughtered in a single day, due to fears of an uprising. He also killed his own family members and nephews, in 1299–1300, after he suspected them of rebellion, by first gouging out their eyes and then beheading them.

In 1308, Alauddin's lieutenant, Malik Kafur captured Warangal, overthrew the Hoysala Empire south of the Krishna River and raided Madurai in Tamil Nadu. He then looted the treasury in capitals and from the temples of south India. Among these loots was the Warangal loot that included one of the largest known diamond in human history, the Koh-i-Noor. Malik Kafur returned to Delhi in 1311, laden with loot and war booty from Deccan peninsula which he submitted to Alauddin Khalji. This made Malik Kafur, born in a Hindu family and who had converted to Islam before becoming Delhi Sultanate's army commander, a favorite of Alauddin Khalji.

Alauddin's military campaign in northern and western India involved the destruction of major Hindu temples and mass-killings of civilians. During the 1301 Ranthambore campaign, Alauddin destroyed the Hindu temples of nearby Jhain. After capturing Chittor Fort in August 1303, he ordered a massacre in which 30,000 local Hindus were killed.

Between 1310 and 1311, Alauddin's general Malik Kafur led military campaigns into southern India against the Hoysala and Pandya kingdoms. His army looted major temple centers including Chidambaram and Srirangam before proceeding to sack the Pandyan capital Madurai. According to Sri Vaishnava temple chronicles (Koil Olugu), Kafur's 1311 sacking of Ranganathaswamy Temple involved looting of its gold and treasures initiating a period of unstability in the region.

In 1311, Alauddin ordered a massacre of Mongols in the Delhi Sultanate wherein between 15,000 and 30,000 Mongol settlers, who had recently converted to Islam, were killed after Khalji suspected them of plotting an uprising against him.

=== The last Khalji sultans ===
Alauddin Khalji died in January 1316. Thereafter, the sultanate witnessed chaos, coup and succession of assassinations. Malik Kafur became the sultan but lacked support from the amirs and was killed within a few months.

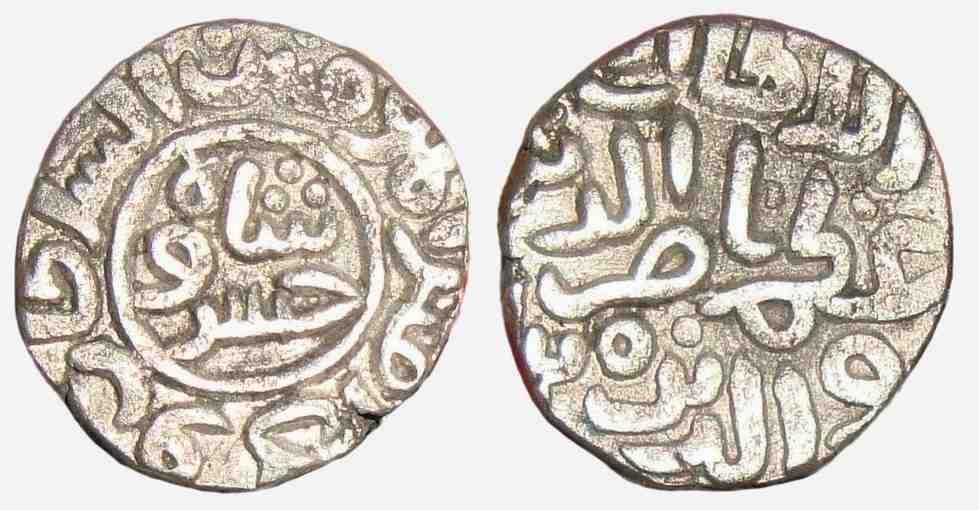
Coinage of Khusrau Khan.

Over the next three years following Malik Kafur's death, another three sultans assumed power violently and/or were killed in coups. First, the amirs installed a six-year-old named Shihab-ud-din Omar as sultan and his teenage brother, Qutbuddin Mubarak Shah, as regent. Qutb killed his younger brother and appointed himself sultan; to win over the loyalty of the amirs and the Malik clan he offered Ghazi Malik the position of army commander in the Punjab. Others were given a choice between various offices and death. After ruling in his own name for less than four years, Mubarak Shah was murdered in 1320 by one of his generals, Khusrau Khan. Amirs persuaded Ghazi Malik, who was still army commander in the Punjab, to lead a coup. Ghazi Malik's forces marched on Delhi, captured Khusraw Khan, and beheaded him. Upon becoming sultan, Ghazi Malik renamed himself Ghiyath al-Din Tughluq, becoming the first ruler of the Tughlaq dynasty.

== Government & administrations ==
Alauddin Khalji changed the tax policies to strengthen his treasury to help pay the keep of his growing army and fund his wars of expansion. He raised agriculture taxes from 20% to 50% – payable in grain and agricultural produce (or cash), eliminating payments and commissions on taxes collected by local chiefs, banned socialization among his officials as well as inter-marriage between noble families to help prevent any opposition forming against him; he cut salaries of officials, poets and scholars in his kingdom.

Regarding the military, historians states the standing army of sultanate during Khilji dynasty consist of 300,000-400,000 horse cavalry and 2500-3000 war elephant. Which is smaller than its successor state, the Tughlaq dynasty, which recorded to possess a standing army of 500,000 cavalry.

=== Economy ===
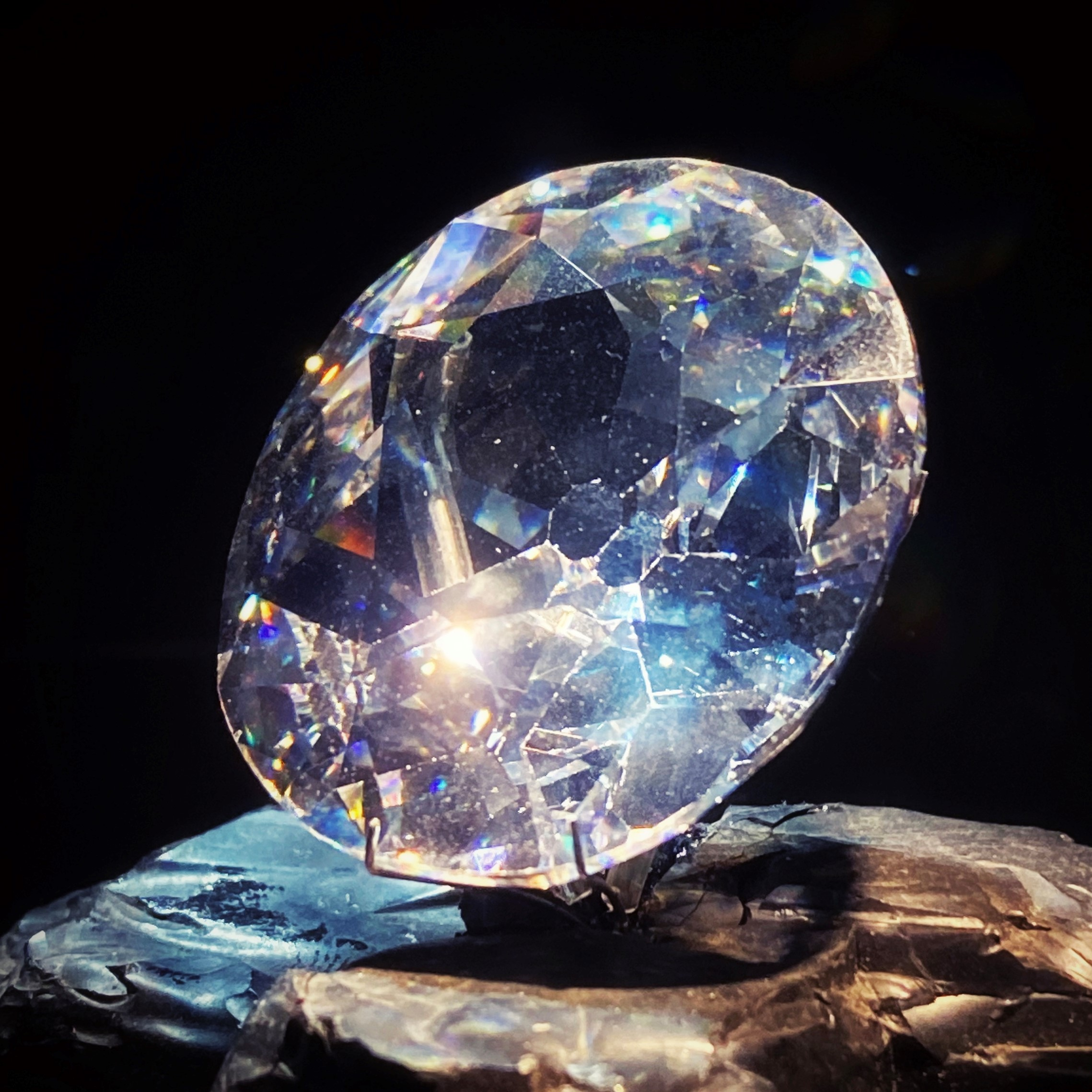
The Koh-i-Noor diamond was seized by Alauddin Khalji's army in 1310, from the Kakatiya dynasty in Warangal.

Alauddin Khalji enforced four taxes on non-Muslims in the Sultanate - jizya (poll tax), kharaj (land tax), kari (house tax), and chari (pasture tax). He also decreed that his Delhi-based revenue officers seize half of all agricultural produce as a tax on stading crops, at the same time abolishing the traditional tax exemptions of Hindu rural chiefs (such as khuts, muqaddams, chauhuris, etc.) so they paid the same tax as ordinary cultivators. His officers enforced tax payment by beating up middlemen responsible for rural tax collection. Furthermore, Alauddin Khalji demanded, state Kulke and Rothermund, from his "wise men in the court" to create "rules and regulations in order to grind down the common man, so as to reduce them to abject poverty and deprive them of wealth and any form of surplus property that could foster a rebellion.Contemporary chronicler Ziauddin Barani states that these measures were specifically aimed at reducing the Hindu rural aristocracy. The aim was to reduce them to poverty thereby prohibiting them from riding horses, carrying weapons, or accumulating gold and silver. At the same time, he confiscated all landed property from his courtiers and officers. Revenue assignments to Muslim jagirdars were also cancelled and the revenue was collected by the central administration. Henceforth, state Kulke and Rothermund, "everybody was busy with earning a living so that nobody could even think of rebellion."

Alauddin Khalji taxation methods and increased taxes reduced agriculture output and the Sultanate witnessed massive inflation. In order to compensate for salaries that he had cut and fixed for Muslim officials and soldiers, Alauddin introduced price controls on all agriculture produce, goods, livestocks and slaves in the kingdom, as well as controls on where, how, and by whom these could be sold. Markets called shahana-i-mandi were created. Muslim merchants were granted exclusive permits and monopoly in these mandi to buy and resell at official prices. No one other than these merchants could buy from farmers or sell in cities. Alauddin deployed an extensive network of Munhiyans (spies, secret police) who would monitor the mandi and had the power to seize anyone trying to buy or sell anything at a price different from the official controlled prices. Those found violating these mandi rules were severely punished, such as by cutting out their flesh. Taxes collected in form of seized crops and grains were stored in sultanate's granaries. Over time, farmers quit farming for income and shifted to subsistence farming, the general food supply worsened in north India, shortages increased and Delhi Sultanate witnessed increasingly worse and extended periods of famines. The Sultan banned private storage of food by anyone. Rationing system was introduced by Alauddin as shortages multiplied; however, the nobility and his army were exempt from the per family quota-based food rationing system. During these famines, Khalji's sultanate granaries and wholesale mandi system with price controls ensured sufficient food for his army, court officials and the urban population in Delhi. Price controls instituted by Khalji reduced prices, but also lowered wages to a point where ordinary people did not benefit from the low prices. The price control system collapsed shortly after the death of Alauddin Khalji, with prices of various agriculture products and wages doubling to quadrupling within a few years.

=== Legacy ===
The tax system introduced during the Khalji dynasty had a long term influence on Indian taxation system and state administration,

Alauddin Khalji's taxation system was probably the one institution from his reign that lasted the longest, surviving indeed into the nineteenth or even the twentieth century. From now on, the land tax (kharaj or mal) became the principal form in which the peasant's surplus was expropriated by the ruling class.

— The Cambridge Economic History of India: c.1200-c.1750,

== Slavery ==
Within Sultanate's capital city of Delhi, during Alauddin Khalji's reign, at least half of the population were slaves working as servants, concubines and guards for the Muslim nobles, amirs, court officials and commanders. Slavery in India during the Khalji dynasty, and later Islamic dynasties, included two groups of people - persons seized during military campaigns, and people who defaulted on their taxes. The institution of slavery and bondage labor became pervasive during the Khalji dynasty; male slaves were referred to as banda, qaid, ghulam, or burdah, while female slaves were called bandi, kaniz or laundi.

== Architecture ==
Alauddin Khalji is credited with the early Indo-Mohammedan architecture, a style and construction campaign that flourished during Tughlaq dynasty. Among works completed during Khalji dynasty, are Alai Darwaza - the southern gateway of Qutb complex enclosure, the Idgah at Rapri, and the Jamat Khana Masjid in Delhi. The Alai Darwaza, completed in 1311, was included as part of Qutb Minar and its Monuments UNESCO World Heritage site in 1993.

Perso-Arabic inscriptions on monuments have been traced to the Khalji dynasty era.

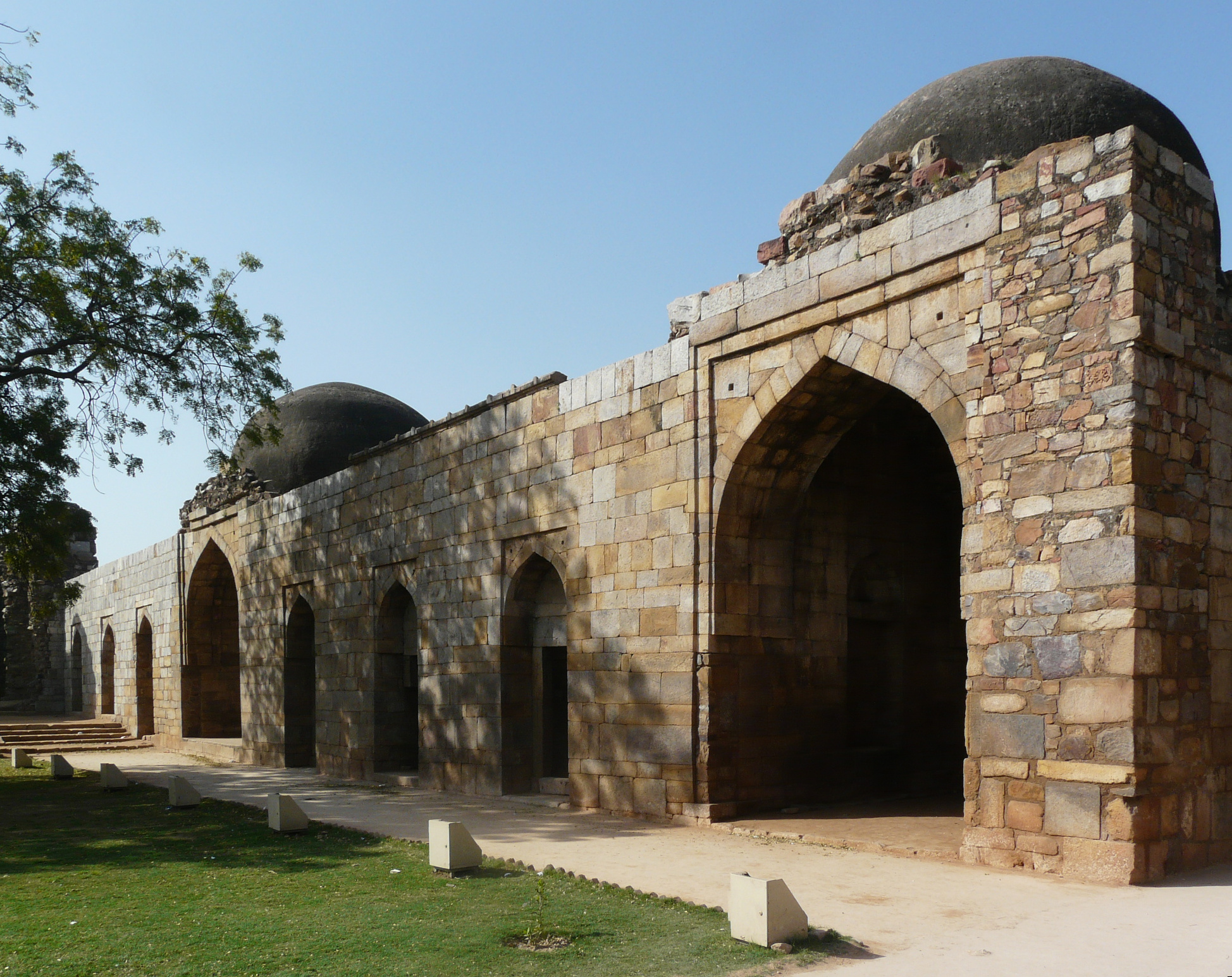
Alauddin Khalji's Madrasa, Qutb complex, Mehrauli, which also has his tomb to the south.

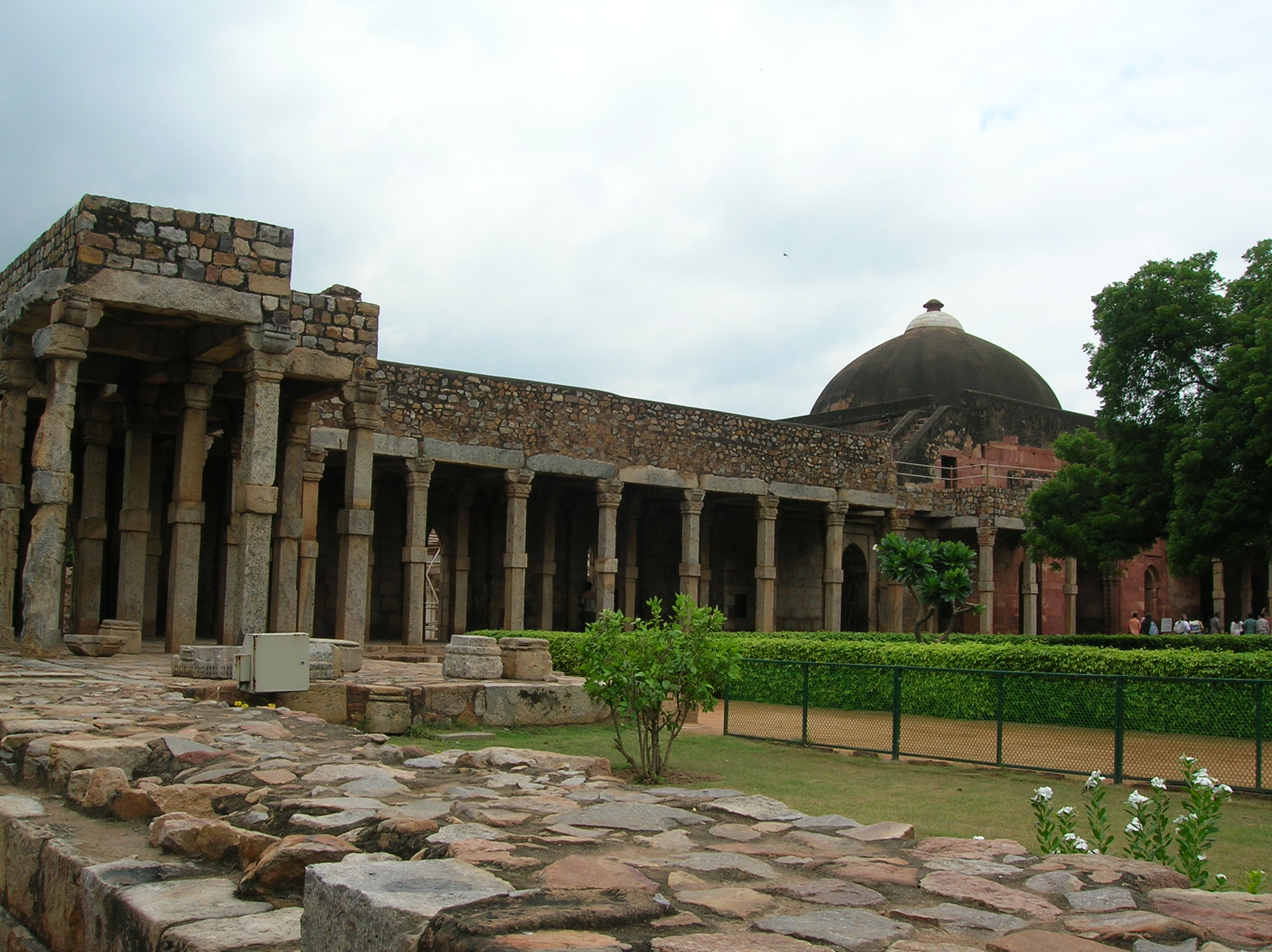
Courts to the east of Quwwat ul-Islam mosque, in Qutb complex added by Khalji in 1300 CE.

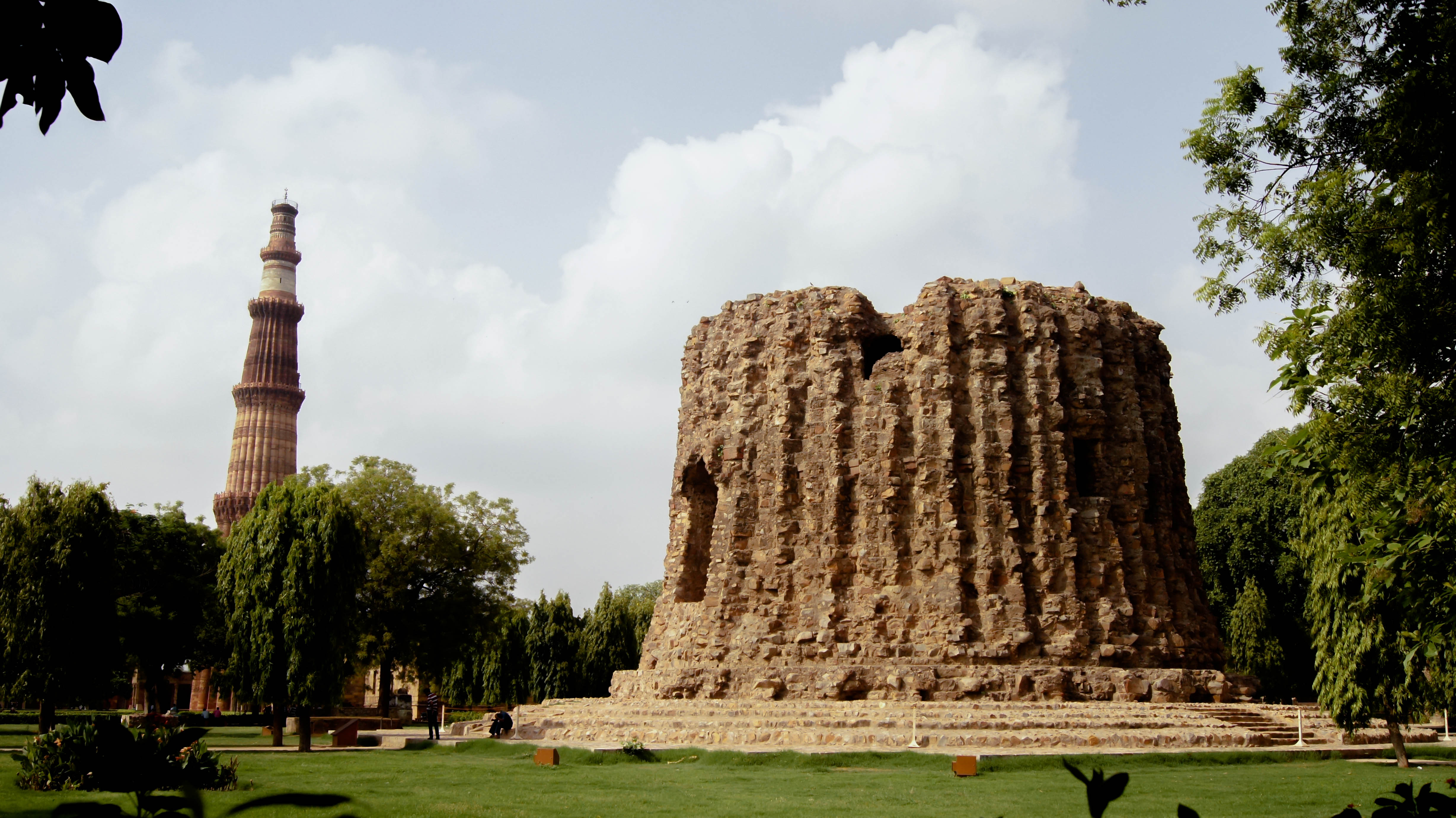
The unfinished Alai Minar

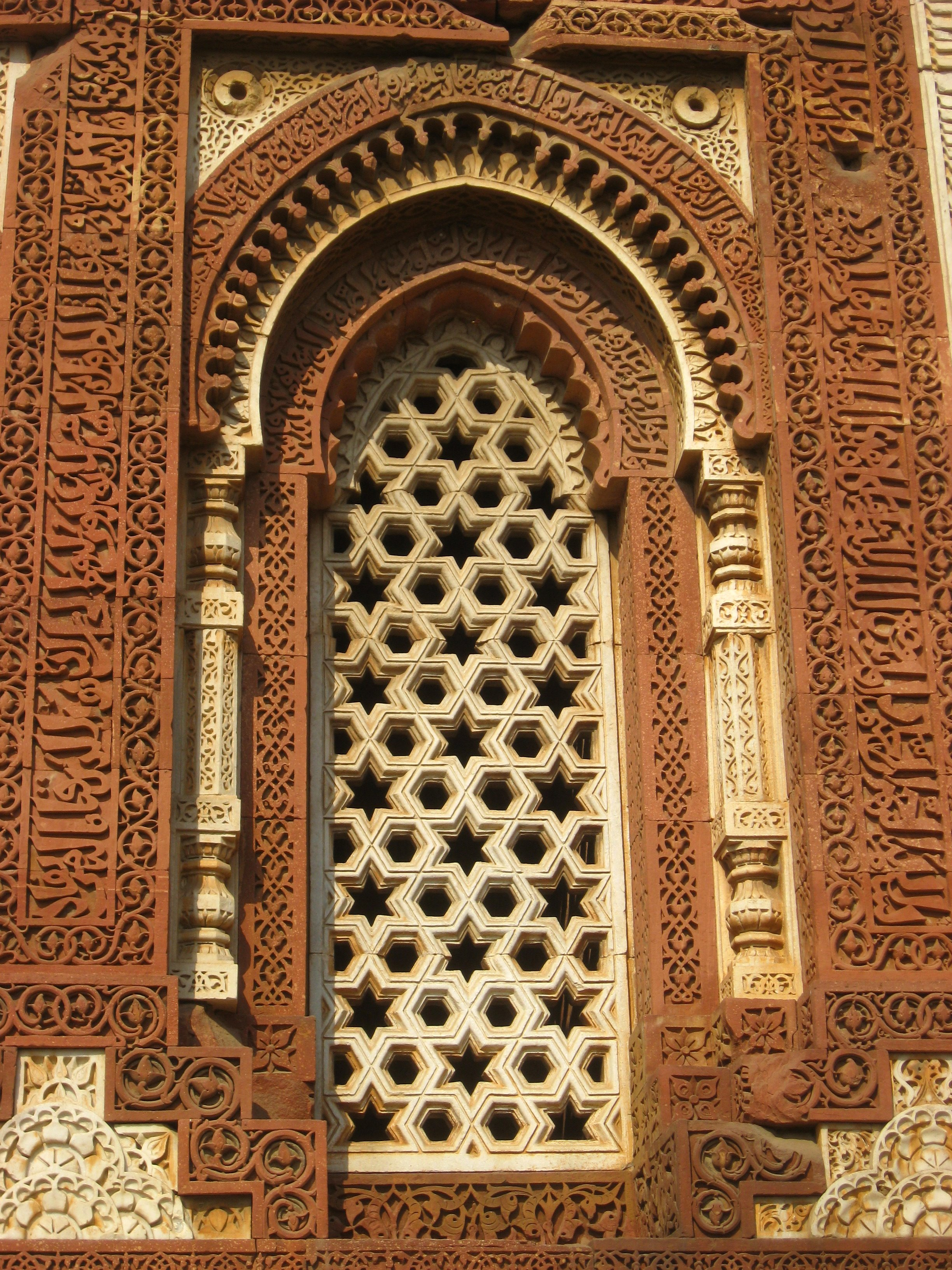
Window of Alai Darwaza.

== Historical sources ==
Historians have questioned the reliability of historical accounts about the Khalji dynasty. Genuine primary sources and historical records from 1260 to 1349 period have not been found. One exception is the short chapter on Delhi Sultanate from 1302 to 1303 AD by Wassaf in Persia, which is duplicated in Jami al-Tawarikh, and which covers the Balban rule, start of Jalal-ud-din Chili's rule and circumstances of the succession of Alauddin Khalji. A semi-fictional poetry (mathnawi) by Yamin al-Din Abul Hasan, also known as Amir Khusrau, is full of adulation for his employer, the reigning Sultan. Khusrau's adulation-filled narrative poetry has been used as a source of Khalji dynasty history, but this is a disputed source. Three historical sources, composed 30 to 115 years after the end of Khalji dynasty, are considered more independent but also questioned given the gap in time. These are Abdul Malik Isami's epic of 1349, Diya-yi Barani's work of 1357 and Sirhindi's account of 1434, which possibly relied on now lost text or memories of people in Khalji's court. Of these Barani's text is the most referred and cited in scholarly sources.

== List of rulers ==
Titular Name	Personal Name	Reign
Shāyista Khān (Jalal-ud-din) جلال الدین	Malik Fīroz ملک فیروز خلجی	1290–1296
Ala-ud-din علاءالدین	Ali Gurshasp علی گرشاسپ خلجی	1296–1316
Shihab-ud-din شھاب الدین	Umar Khan عمر خان خلجی	1316
Qutb-ud-din قطب الدین	Mubarak Khan مبارک خان خلجی	1316–1320
Khusro Khan ended the Khalji dynasty in 1320.

== See also ==
- Ikhtiyar Uddin Muhammad Bin Bakhtiyar Khalji
- Persianate society
- List of Sunni Muslim dynasties
