= Padmaavat =

2018 Indian film by Sanjay Leela Bhansali

- Theatrical release poster
- Directed by: Sanjay Leela Bhansali
- Screenplay by: Sanjay Leela Bhansali; Prakash Kapadia
- Based on: Padmavat by Malik Muhammad Jayasi
- Produced by: Sanjay Leela Bhansali; Sudhanshu Vats; Ajit Andhare
- Starring: Deepika Padukone; Ranveer Singh; Shahid Kapoor; Aditi Rao Hydari
- Cinematography: Sudeep Chatterjee
- Edited by: Rajesh G. Pandey
- Music by: Songs: Sanjay Leela Bhansali; Score: Sanchit Balhara
- Production company: Bhansali Productions
- Distributed by: Viacom18 Motion Pictures
- Release date: 25 January 2018
- Running time: 163 minutes
- Country: India
- Language: Hindi
- Budget: ₹180–190 crore
- Box office: est. ₹572 crore

Padmaavat is a 2018 Indian Hindi-language epic historical drama film directed by Sanjay Leela Bhansali. Based on the epic poem of the same name by Malik Muhammad Jayasi, it stars Deepika Padukone as Rani Padmavati, a Sinhalese-born Rajput queen known for her beauty, wife of Maharawal Ratan Singh, played by Shahid Kapoor. Sultan Alauddin Khilji, played by Ranveer Singh, hears of her beauty and attacks her kingdom to enslave her. Aditi Rao Hydari, Jim Sarbh, Raza Murad, and Anupriya Goenka are featured in supporting roles.

With a production budget of ₹180 crore (US$26.32 million)–₹190 crore (US$27.78 million), Padmaavat is one of the most expensive Indian films ever made. Initially scheduled for release on 1 December 2017, the film faced numerous controversies. Amid violent protests, its release was indefinitely delayed. The Central Board of Film Certification later approved the film with few changes, which includes the addition of multiple disclaimers and a change from its original title Padmavati. It was rescheduled for release on 25 January 2018 in 2D, 3D and IMAX 3D formats, making it the first Indian film to be released in IMAX 3D.

Upon release, Padmaavat received mixed-to-positive reviews from critics, with praise for the visuals, costume design, cinematography, screenplay, soundtrack, and performances, but criticism for its pacing, runtime, and adherence to regressive patriarchal mores. Critics also disliked the portrayal of Khilji as a stereotypical evil Muslim king and Ratan Singh as the righteous Hindu king, which led to protests by the respective religious communities. Despite not being released in some states of India, it grossed over ₹571.98 crore (US$59 million) at the box office, becoming a major commercial success and the third highest-grossing Indian film of 2018.

At the 64th Filmfare Awards, Padmaavat received a leading 18 nominations, including Best Film, Best Director (both for Bhansali), Best Actress (Padukone) and Best Actor (Singh), and won 4, including Best Actor (Critics) (Singh) and Best Music Director (Bhansali). It also won 3 National Film Awards, including Best Music Direction (Bhansali).

== Plot ==
In the 13th century, Jalal-ud-din Khilji plots to seize the Delhi throne. His ambitious nephew, Alauddin Khilji, marries Jalal-ud-din's daughter, Mehrunisa. On their wedding night, Alauddin brutally kills a courtier who witnesses him committing adultery. Despite a horrified Mehrunisa learning of his ruthlessness, the marriage proceeds, and Alauddin is appointed a military commander. Concurrently, in the kingdom of Singhal, Princess Padmavati accidentally wounds Maharawal Ratan Singh, the Rajput ruler of Mewar, during a hunt. As she nurses him back to health, the two fall in love and are married with her father's blessing.

Jalal-ud-din successfully takes the Delhi throne and sends Alauddin to repel a Mongol invasion. Following his victory, Alauddin launches an unauthorized raid on Devagiri to expand his wealth and influence. Concerned by his rising ambition, Jalal-ud-din's advisors warn the Sultan. Jalal-ud-din travels to meet his nephew, gifting him an exceptionally skilled slave named Malik Kafur. Alauddin exploits the meeting, ordering Kafur and his generals to assassinate the Sultan and his ministers. Alauddin then returns to Delhi and declares himself the new Sultan, with Kafur rising to become his closest confidant and military general.

Padmavati accompanies Ratan Singh to Mewar, where the court priest, Raghav Chetan, is banished after being caught spying on the royal couple's intimate moments. Seeking revenge, Chetan travels to Delhi and describes Padmavati's extraordinary beauty to Alauddin. Driven by an obsessive desire to possess the world's most exceptional things, Alauddin demands Padmavati's presence. When the Rajputs refuse his invitation, an enraged Alauddin launches a military siege against the capital of Chittor.

After six months of a stale siege, Alauddin feigns a peace offering during the festival of Holi. He is granted entry into Chittor, where he requests to see Padmavati. Ratan Singh permits a brief glimpse through a system of mirrors without allowing Alauddin to see her face directly. Shortly after, Alauddin betrays his hosts, capturing Ratan Singh during a farewell protocol and extracting him to Delhi as a hostage.

To secure her husband's release, Padmavati agrees to travel to Delhi under strict conditions, including the execution of the treacherous Chetan and private access to Ratan Singh. Alauddin agrees. Meanwhile, Alauddin survives an assassination attempt by his own nephew, killing him when he tries to finish the job. Taking advantage of the distraction, Padmavati arrives in Delhi. Disguised Rajput soldiers launch a surprise ambush during the morning prayers. With the secret assistance of an empathetic Mehrunisa, Padmavati and Mewar's generals, Gora and Badal, successfully free Ratan Singh. Ratan encounters a wounded Alauddin but refuses to kill him, citing the Rajput code of honor against attacking an injured opponent. The Rajputs successfully cover the royal couple's escape, though Gora and Badal are killed in the skirmish.

A furious Alauddin imprisons Mehrunisa for treason and marches his entire army back to Chittor for a final assault. Outside the fortress walls, Ratan Singh and Alauddin engage in a fierce single duel. Ratan disarms the Sultan and prepares to deliver the final blow, but Malik Kafur dishonorably shoots Ratan in the back with arrows. As he dies, Ratan denounces the Khilji forces for their lack of chivalry.

With the Rajput army defeated, the Khilji forces breach the fort. Realizing that military defense has failed, the Rajput women, led by Padmavati, choose to protect their dignity over capture. They march into a massive, roaring pyre to commit Jauhar (mass self-immolation). Alauddin storms the inner palace only to find burning embers, turning his military conquest into a total psychological defeat.

== Cast ==
- Deepika Padukone as Padmavati – a 13th–14th century legendary Rajput queen, who was, according to Padmaavat, the wife of Rajput king Ratan Singh (also known as Ratan Sen), the ruler of Mewar. The news of Padmavati's beauty reached Sultan Alauddin Khilji, who besieged Singh's capital, Chittor, motivated by his desire to capture the queen.
- Shahid Kapoor as Rawal Ratan Singh – the last Rajput ruler of the Guhila dynasty that ruled the kingdom of Mewar. He was defeated by Alauddin Khilji's forces during the siege of Chittor.
- Ranveer Singh as Alauddin Khilji – the second and most powerful ruler of the Khilji dynasty that ruled the Delhi Sultanate. He ascended the throne by murdering his paternal uncle and father-in-law, Sultan Jalal-ud-Din Khalji. According to Padmaavat, Khilji laid siege to Chittor motivated by his desire to capture Ratan Singh's beautiful wife, Padmavati.
- Aditi Rao Hydari as Mehrunisa – the first wife of Alauddin Khilji and Queen of the Delhi Sultanate
- Jim Sarbh as Malik Kafur – a prominent eunuch slave-general of Alauddin Khilji
- Raza Murad as Jalal-ud-Din Khalji – the founder and first Sultan of the Khilji dynasty that ruled the Delhi Sultanate. He was deposed by his nephew and son-in-law Alauddin, who murdered his uncle to usurp the throne.
- Anupriya Goenka as Nagmati– the first wife and chief queen of Ratan Singh according to Padmaavat. Nagmati and her husband's second wife, Padmavati, performed jauhar together after Alauddin Khilji attacked Chittor.
- Ujjwal Chopra as Gora Singh
- Bhawani Muzamil as Amir Khusro
- Deepak Shreemali as Badal Singh
- Ashwin Dhar as Ulugh Khan
- Ayaz Khan as Hakeem
- Aayam Mehta as Raghav Chetan (Bramhachari)

== Production ==
=== Development ===
An adaptation of Malik Muhammad Jayasi's epic Padmavat (1540), Sanjay Leela Bhansali had been planning a film adaptation for a decade. He first worked on a television adaptation as an assistant editor for Shyam Benegal's television series Bharat Ek Khoj (1988), based on Jawaharlal Nehru's The Discovery of India (1946), featuring an episode about Padmaavat starring Om Puri as Alauddin Khilji. In 2008, Bhansali produced an opera version in Paris, inspiring him to begin work on a film version. Padmaavat also took inspiration from other earlier adaptations of the epic, including Bengali literary adaptations from Kshirode Prasad Vidyavinode in 1906 and Abanindranath Tagore in 1909, the Tamil film Chittoor Rani Padmini (1963), and the Hindi film Maharani Padmini (1964).

Pre-production on the film began in July 2016. That same month, playback singer Shreya Ghoshal tweeted about performing a song composed by Bhansali for the film. Many media outlets speculated that Deepika Padukone and Ranveer Singh, who played the leads in Bhansali's Goliyon Ki Raasleela Ram-Leela (2013) and Bajirao Mastani (2015), were finalised to play Rani Padmavati and Alauddin Khilji in the film. In October 2016, it was announced that Bhansali would team up with Viacom 18 Motion Pictures to produce the film with Singh and Padukone along with Shahid Kapoor as Rawal Ratan Singh, playing the lead roles.

=== Casting ===
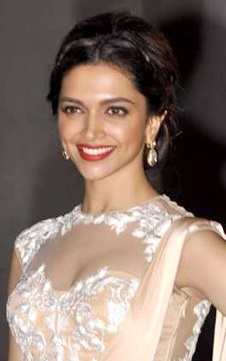
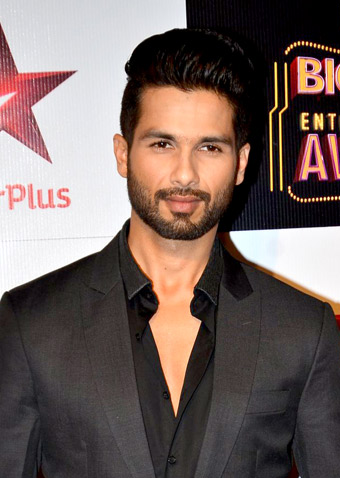
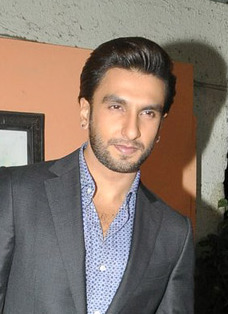
The three main actors, Padukone (top), Kapoor (centre) and Singh (bottom).

Padmaavat is the third collaboration between Deepika Padukone and Ranveer Singh with Sanjay Leela Bhansali. The trio had worked before in Goliyon Ki Raasleela Ram-Leela (2013) and Bajirao Mastani (2015), while it is Kapoor's first film with the three. Their co-star from the previous films, Priyanka Chopra was also in consideration to play the title role.

Shah Rukh Khan was offered the role of Rawal Ratan Singh but felt it was not "meaty" enough and declined; failure to agree on his fee may have been a factor. Bhansali offered the role to Sushant Singh Rajput, but he had to turn down the role over scheduling issues. Shahid Kapoor was finally cast with an assurance of a good enough part and a hefty fee. For his role, Kapoor undertook rigorous training under trainer Samir Jaura and followed a strict diet for 40 days. He also learnt sword fighting and the basics of Mardani khel, a weapon-based martial art, and admitted that it had been one of the most physically and emotionally challenging roles of his career.

Ranveer Singh portrays the antagonist of the film, Alauddin Khilji, the first negative role of his career. Director Bhansali had given him books to read delving into the psyche of dark rulers of history such as Adolf Hitler, asserting that he had to completely forget who he was before he could play Khilji. Singh trained under Mustafa Ahmed to get into proper shape for the role. The actor worked out twice a day for six days a week. Playing Khilji affected Singh's personality and behaviour such that he had to see a psychiatrist to return to normal.

Jaya Bachchan recommended Aditi Rao Hydari's name to Bhansali for the role of Khilji's first wife, Mehrunisa. Bhansali cast Hydari over four other choices. She is the only member of the star cast who actually belongs to a royal lineage.

Raza Murad portrays Alauddin's paternal uncle and Khilji dynasty founder, Sultan Jalaluddin Khilji. Murad has earlier collaborated with Bhansali in Goliyon Ki Rasleela Ram-Leela and Bajirao Mastani. Jim Sarbh portrays Malik Kafur, a prominent eunuch slave-general of Alauddin Khilji. Sarbh learned horse-riding for the role.

On 25 October 2017, a video of the first song from the film, titled "Ghoomar", was released, in which a woman dressed like a queen appeared briefly. It was later revealed in a Twitter fan page of Sanjay Leela Bhansali Productions, that the woman is Maharawal Ratan Singh's first wife, Rani Nagmati, who is portrayed by Anupriya Goenka.

=== Budget ===
Due to the costs mounted on the film by delay in the release, Box Office India declared the film's budget to be ₹215 crore (US$31.44 million), which makes it the most expensive Hindi film and one of the most expensive Indian films ever made.

=== Costumes ===
Delhi-based Rimple and Harpreet Narula designed Rani Padmavati's costume using traditional Gota embroidery work of Rajasthan. The border derives from the architectural details of Rajasthani palace windows and jharokhas and the odhnis have been styled in conventional ways which are still prevalent in the Mewar belt of Rajasthan. The designer duo elaborated that the costume worn by Padukone in the final scene of the film features the tree-of-life motif and twisted gota embroidery and has a Kota dupatta with block printing. Padukone's dresses were made with Sinhalese influences, as the character of Padmavati hailed from Sri Lanka.

The costumes for Shahid Kapoor were made from mulmul and cotton, with special attention given to the turbans, one of which, featuring a 28-dye lehariya, was inspired by a turban to be found at the Victoria and Albert Museum in London. The clothes for Ranveer Singh were based on travellers' accounts of the Turko-Persian influence on Indian clothing (Khilji was of Turko-Afghan heritage). The costumes for Aditi Rao Hydari, who plays Khilji's first wife Mehrunisa, incorporated Turkish, Afghan, Mongol and Ottoman elements to showcase Mehrunisa's Turkic origins. For both Singh and Hydari's costumes, extensive research was done on the clothing and textiles of the Turkish belt, from Afghanistan and Khyber Pakhtunkhwa to Kazakhstan and to the Central Asian belt around Turkey.

Padukone's look for the "Ghoomar" song features intricate jewellery weighing up to 3 kg (6.6 lb) designed by Tanishq featuring a triple Borla, Mathapatti and Bajuband which are traditional ornaments worn by Rajasthani women.

Vipul Amar and Harsheen Arora of Delhi-based design house 'The V Renaissance' designed costumes for Rawal Ratan Singh and Alauddin Khilji, employing historical techniques to create the armour such as cuirboilli, sculpting, chiselling, and inlaying. The armour took a team of forty workers a total of eight months to prepare.

== Music ==
The score of Padmaavat is composed by Sanchit Balhara, while the songs are composed by Sanjay Leela Bhansali. A. M. Turaz and Siddharth-Garima wrote the lyrics to the songs. The first song "Ghoomar", to which Padukone performs the traditional Rajasthani folk dance on a set that replicates the interior of Chittorgarh Fort, was released on 25 October 2017. The second song from the film "Ek Dil Ek Jaan", a love ballad featuring Padukone and Kapoor, was released on 19 November. The complete soundtrack was released by the record label T-Series on 6 January 2018 in Hindi, and 12 January in Tamil and Telugu.

== Controversies ==
Padmaavat was mired in controversies during its production. Several Rajput caste organisations including Shri Rajput Karni Sena and its members had protested and later vandalised the film sets claiming that the film portrays Padmavati, a Rajput queen, in bad light. They had also assaulted Bhansali on a film set. The Sena had made further threats of violence. While filming a scene in Masai Plateau, Kolhapur at night in October 2017, some people attacked and set the set ablaze, injuring animals and destroying several costumes. Several Muslim leaders protested against the misrepresentation of Alauddin Khilji and called for a ban. In the days leading up to the film's release, there were violent protests and riots in several parts of India. In Haryana, the protestors had attacked several vehicles including a school bus.

Bhansali and Deepika Padukone had received threats of violence and death. The film makers received support from the film community and industry associations including the Indian Film & Television Directors' Association, Cine & TV Artists Association, Western India Cinematographers' Association, Association of Cine & Television Art Directors & Costume Designers.

Major political parties across India took conflicting stands. Several members and leaders of the Bharatiya Janata Party called for a ban on the film. The Rajasthan State unit of the Indian National Congress had also called for a ban.

The controversies surrounding the film re-opened the question of film censorship in India and the country's freedom of expression. The Supreme Court dismissed a petition calling to stop the film's release citing the freedom of speech and expression.

The film is banned in Malaysia by the Home Ministry due to its negative portrayal of a Muslim ruler and for touching sensitivities of Islam since Malaysia is predominantly a Muslim nation.

== Release ==
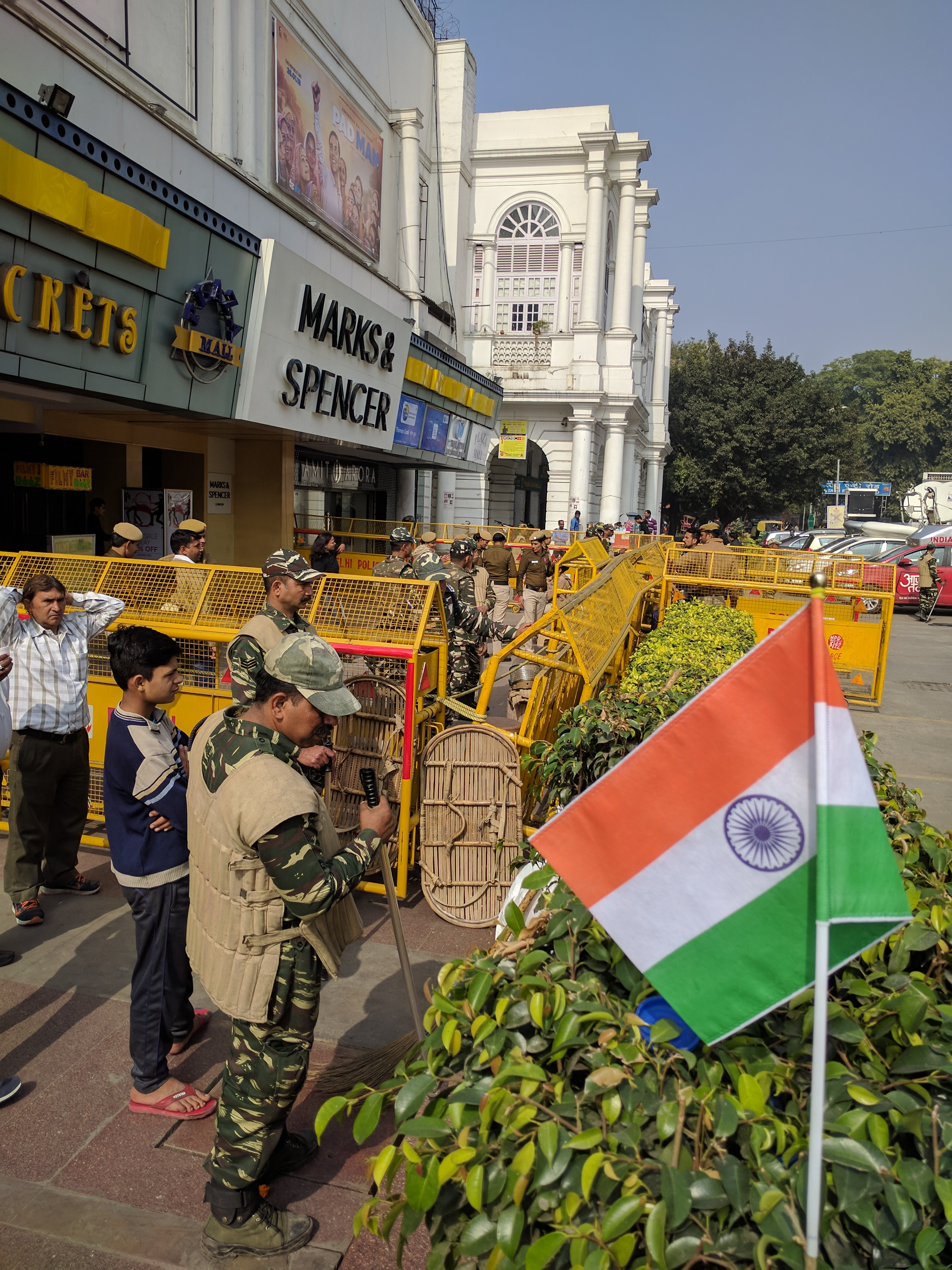
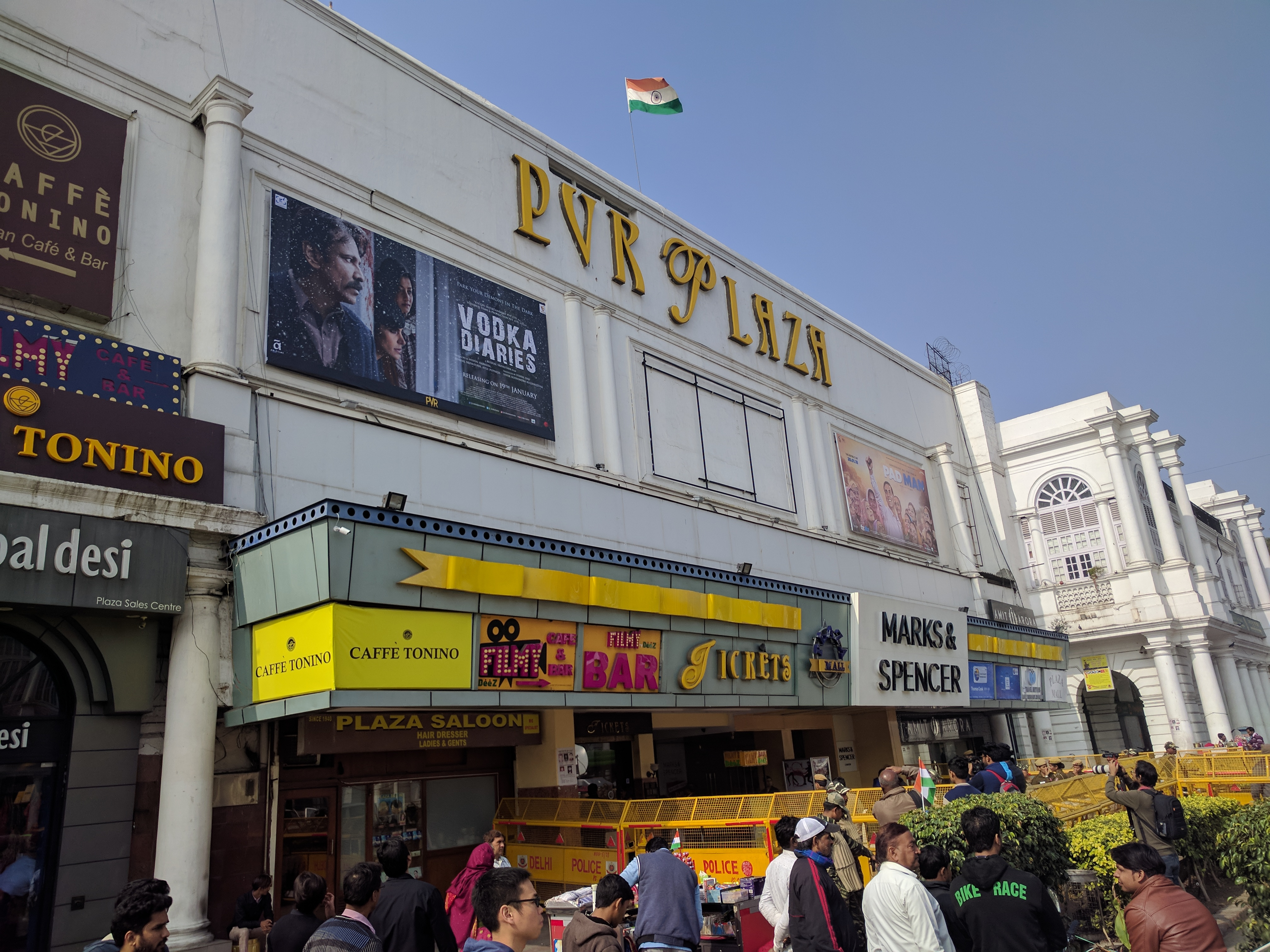
During the launch of Padmaavat, there was heavy police presence deployed outside PVR Plaza, CP, New Delhi, as well as all cinema halls in the region (top). Note that no poster for Padmaavat was put up at PVR CP, as was the case reported across other cinema halls as well (bottom).

The digital streaming rights of Padmaavat were sold to Amazon Prime Video for ₹200–250 million in August 2017. Although it was reported theatrical distribution rights for all overseas territories were acquired by Paramount Pictures from Viacom18 in October 2017, Paramount later clarified that they would release the film only in the United Kingdom, Ireland, Australia, New Zealand and the Middle East. Prime Focus Limited rendered the film in 3D. The film was initially scheduled for theatrical release on 1 December 2017 in India, but was delayed due to protests.

Padmavati was initially slated for release in the United Arab Emirates on 30 November 2017 and in the United Kingdom on 1 December 2017, but the makers stated that the film would not be released in foreign territories before receiving a certificate from the Central Board of Film Certification (CBFC). In the end of December, CBFC approved the film for theatrical exhibition and suggested 5 modifications to the film, which includes the addition of multiple disclaimers and amending its title to Padmaavat. The change in the title was intended to be a disclaimer that the film is not a historical drama, but a cinematic adaptation of Malik Muhammad Jayasi's epic poem Padmavat.

The British Board of Film Classification (BBFC) passed the film with a (12A) rating and zero cuts.

Post the CBFC approval with U/A certification, the film got banned by the Chief Ministers of four states Rajasthan, Gujarat, Madhya Pradesh and Haryana in order to maintain 'law and order' and avert protests in their states. The Supreme Court of India over-ruled the ban, stating that freedom of speech is to be maintained and that the states have to ensure the screening of the film without any issues. On 30 January 2018, Malaysia banned the film.

Padmaavat premiered on television on 30 September 2018 on the Hindi general entertainment channels (GEC) Colors, Colors HD, and the Hindi movie channel Rishtey Cineplex. The film was dubbed and released in Tamil, Telugu and Kannada languages under the same title.

== Reception ==
=== Critical response ===
On the review aggregator website Rotten Tomatoes, 55% of 29 critics' reviews are positive, with an average rating of 6/10.. Metacritic, which uses a weighted average, assigned the film a score of 63 out of 100, based on 6 critics, indicating "generally favorable" reviews.

==== India ====
Padmaavat opened to mixed-to-positive critical reviews upon release. Critics praised the visuals, screenplay, cinematography, and the performance of Singh, but criticized its execution, running time and the "unwanted" 3D conversion.

Following its controversies, the makers held a pre-screening of Padmaavat in November 2017 for some journalists, including Arnab Goswami and Rajat Sharma, who praised the film and described it as "the greatest tribute to Rajput pride." Rajat Sharma particularly praised Singh's performance as Khilji.

Taran Adarsh of Bollywood Hungama gave 4.5 stars and said, "On the whole, Padmaavat is a remarkable motion picture experience that's backed by proficient direction, spellbinding screenwriting and superlative acting. For Bhansali, it's the best title on an impressive filmography." Neil Soans of The Times of India gave 4 stars and said, "The director's expertise in heightening opulence and grandeur is well-known, further distinguishable in 3D. Cinematographer Sudeep Chatterjee compliments him by beautifully capturing some jaw-dropping scenery." Rachit Gupta of Filmfare gave 3.5 stars and said, "the real wonder of Padmaavat comes from its production and presentation. This film has phenomenal production design, costumes and camera work. The technical finesse on display is just mind boggling." Rajeev Masand of News18 gave 3.5 stars, praising Singh's performance.

Kunal Guha of Mumbai Mirror gave 3.5 stars, but criticised Padukone and Kapoor's performances. Giving 3.5 stars, Sushant Mehta of India Today panned Padukone and Kapoor's performances, calling them "mediocre", while terming Singh's "unconvincing".

Anupama Chopra of Film Companion gave the film 2.5 out of 5 stars and said, "I clinically admired each frame. I applauded the work of cinematographer Sudeep Chatterjee, costume designers Harpreet-Rimple, Maxima Basu, Chandrakant & Ajay, and production designers Subrata Chakraborty and Amit Ray. But I wasn't seduced by the storytelling." Shubhra Gupta of The Indian Express gave 2.5 stars and said, "Padmaavat is spectacular [to look]: no one can do spectacle like Bhansali. You can easily delight in it while the going is good. But nearly three hours of it, and looping rhetoric around what constitutes Rajput valour can, and does, become tiresome." Mayur Sanap of Deccan Chronicle criticised the execution and the length and gave 2.5 stars. Suparna Sharma, also of Deccan Chronicle gave 2.5 stars and said, "Padmaavat is offensively chauvinistic, blatantly right-wing, and quite unabashedly anti-Muslim".

Raja Sen of NDTV India gave 1.5 stars and said, "Bhansali takes an unbearable length of time to spark the flame. Things go on and on and on, with characters it is impossible to care about. They may appear attractive from time to time, certainly, but these protagonists are inconsistent, infuriating and test the patience."

Rediff.com also gave 1.5 stars calling it "superficial" and wrote, "Padukone gets an absolute raw deal as the Queen; her performance is submissively overwrought, blandly weighted, and her speeches combined with the leisureliness of the narrative's pacing, can put you in a stupor. Worst of all, you will be driven by the suspicion if Padukone even does enough to deserve the movie's title." Namrata Joshi of The Hindu gave a negative review noting the film is "a yawn fest" and "an interminable expanse of unadulterated dullness". She also criticised the 3D conversion writing, "The opulence doesn't seem as awe-inspiring, the special effects, especially in some of the battle scenes, are plain tacky and the actors seem like cardboard dolls of themselves in the long shots, acquiring a human visage only in the extreme". Anna M. M. Vetticad of Firstpost criticised the film giving 1 star out of 5 writing "Padmaavat is a perfect example of a Hindi film couching its extreme prejudices in grandiloquence and tacky clichés, with those clichés embedded in resplendent frames."

==== Overseas ====
Mike McCahill of The Guardian gave 4 stars and said, "It's not just the extravagance that catches the eye, but the precision with which it is applied. Every twirl of every sari and every arrow in every battle appears to have been guided by the hands of angels. Such excess could have proved deadening, but dynamic deployment of old-school star power keeps almost all its scenes alive with internal tensions." Shilpa Jamkhandikar published a mixed review in Reuters, who noted, "But unlike Bhansali's earlier films, where he was able to find emotional depth even in opulent historical romances, this one falls short." However, she praised Singh's performance as Khilji. Manjusha Radhakrishnan of Gulf News opined that the quality of the work was lower than that in other Bhansali films. Sadaf Haider of DAWN Images said that the film is "a flawed history lesson", however, she praised the film visual, music and most of the act. Rahul Aijaz of The Express Tribune rated 4.5 out of 5 stars; he too praised the film and said that it "doesn't set up false expectations and then disappoint" due to "perfect storytelling", and "memorable performances". A Pakistani critic, Haroon Khalid, had disliked the portrayal of Khilji as a stereotypical evil Muslim king and Ratan Singh as the righteous Hindu king.

=== Box office ===
The film was released in only 70% of places in India. However, despite limited screenings, the film earned an estimated ₹5 crore (US$731,106.38) in Wednesday paid previews. The following day, the film opened nationwide across 4,800 screens of which over 500 screens were shown in Tamil and Telugu. It earned an estimated ₹19 crore (US$2.78 million) nett on its opening day in India, excluding previews, which was considered impressive despite its ban in numerous big states and marked a career-best opening for Kapoor, Singh and Bhansali, and fourth biggest for Padukone (behind Happy New Year, Chennai Express and Yeh Jawaani Hai Deewani). On Friday, the film added another ₹32 crore (US$4.68 million), owing to national holiday on Republic Day. This was followed by a gradual fall on Saturday taking in another ₹27 crore (US$3.95 million). Through Sunday, the film delivered an opening weekend of ₹114 crore (US$16.67 million) and became the fourteenth film to enter the 100 crore club in just under 4 days. Furthermore, it broke the record for the biggest IMAX opening in India with US$461,000 from 12 screens. However, due to its limited screenings, the film nevertheless lost over ₹35 crore (US$5.12 million) in box office receipts during its opening weekend.

Outside India, the film broke all-time opening day records in Australia (A$367,984), surpassing the likes of Dangal and the dubbed-Hindi version of Baahubali 2: The Conclusion. One of the reason behind the film's successful run in the country was because Paramount (the overseas distributing company) was able to secure release in all three major theatre chains (Hoyts, Event Cinemas and Village Cinemas) unlike other Bollywood films which have to choose between the two latter. In the United States and Canada, the film grossed $1.13 million on its opening day. This was followed by the biggest ever single-day for a Hindi film with $1.8 million on Saturday, breaking the previous record held by PK ($1.41 million). Although Baahubali 2: The Conclusion still holds the record for all Indian films, that is inclusive of three different languages. It went on to set a new opening weekend record for a Hindi film with $4.2 million, and witnessed the second best per-theatre-average inside the top 10 with $13,188 from 324 theatres. As of 6 February 2018, the film has crossed ₹4 billion (US$42 million) worldwide, making it one of the top 10 highest-grossing Bollywood films of all time. Its domestic net income was ₹2.75 billion (US$29 million) in the fourth weekend of its run.

== Historical inaccuracies ==
In the film, the Delhi Sultanate's flag is shown in black colour with a white crescent moon. The Sultanate actually had a green flag with a black band running vertically on the left. Most historians believe little evidence exists for Padmavati in real life. And, in the original Padmavat poem written by Malik Muhammad Jayasi, Khilji never had a direct confrontation with Raja Ratansen.

It was shown in the film that, Malik Kafur was gifted as a slave to Alauddin Khalji, while he was actually captured by Alauddin's army general Nusrat Khan Jalesari, during the 1299 invasion of Gujarat, and converted to Islam.

=== Portrayal of Jalaluddin and Alauddin Khilji ===
Before their ascension to the throne, Jalaluddin and Alauddin Khilji were known as Malik Firuz and Ali Gurshasp, respectively.

Jalaluddin Khilji is portrayed as an arrogant, cunning and cruel man, though he was actually popular for being a mild-mannered, humble, and pious ruler. Jalaluddin ascended the throne of Delhi in 1290 only to end the chaos that ensued after the death of Sultan Ghiyas ud din Balban. He was not ambitious by nature and did not lead an attack on the Delhi Sultanate from Ghazni, Afghanistan.

The portrayal of Alauddin Khilji in the film has been criticised by historians and critics for its historical and geographical inaccuracies and not staying faithful to the epic Padmavat. The film shows an unsuccessful assassination plot by Alauddin's nephew, one which seriously injures the Sultan, but none of this actually happened. Historian Rana Safvi wrote that Khilji was sophisticated, not barbarian as portrayed in the film. Historian Mohammed Safiullah also criticised Khilji's portrayal and the implicit depiction of a homosexual relationship between Khilji and his slave-general Malik Kafur. Historian Archana Ojha of Delhi University criticised Alauddin Khilji's look and clothing in the film.

== See also ==
- List of highest-grossing Indian films
- List of historical films set in Asia
