= Nagmati =

- Maharani of Mewar
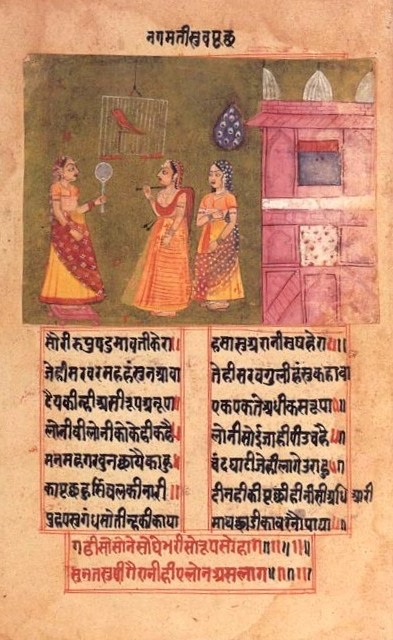
- Queen Nagmati talks to her parrot, an illustrated manuscript of Padmavat from c. 1750 CE
- Spouse: Ratan Sen
- Religion: Hinduism

Nagmati was, according to legend, the first wife and chief queen of King Ratan Sen (identified with Ratnasimha), the Rajput ruler of Medapata (present-day Mewar). Nagmati plays an important role in Malik Muhammad Jayasi's epic poem Padmavat.

== In Padmavat ==
In Padmavat, an epic poem written by Malik Muhammad Jayasi in 1540, Nagmati is said to have been King Ratan Sen's first wife and chief queen. She awaits happily as her husband returns home to Chittor, but the happiness turns to jealousy and contempt when she hears that he has taken a second wife, Padmavati, the beautiful princess of the Sinhala Kingdom. Ratan Sen assures an insecure Nagmati that as his first wife, she is still the most dear to him.

Nagmati and Padmavati develop a rivalry of sorts, each vying for their husband's attention and love. Initially, Ratan Sen placates them by spending nights with them alternately, but then establishes peace by reprimanding them. After arriving in Chittor, the news of Padmavati's beauty reaches Alauddin Khilji, the Sultan of Delhi. His demand that she is handed over to him is refused, whereupon he marches to and besieges Chittor. Alauddin captures Ratan Sen in a deceitful manner and takes him back to Delhi as a prisoner. Ratan Sen is later able to escape with his two faithful warriors - Gora and Badal. Shortly afterwards, Ratan Sen is defeated by deceit and killed in a battle against King Deopal of Kumbhalgarh. Both Nagmati and Padmavati commit jauhar (the Hindu custom of mass self-immolation) along with other women of the fort after Ratan Sen's death to protect their honour from Alauddin Khilji, who successfully conquers Chittor Fort.

== In popular culture ==
- Nagmati is portrayed by Anupriya Goenka in the Indian historical film (portrayal of this poetry) Padmaavat.

Jayasi in his Padmavat impressively illustrates the pain of separation of the Queen Nagmati in "Nagmati Viyog Khand", which is remarkable in Hindi literature.

== Bibliography ==
- Jackson, Guida M. (1996). Encyclopedia of literary epics. Santa Barbara, Calif. [u.a.]: ABC-CLIO. ISBN 9780874367737.
- Ramya Sreenivasan (2007). The Many Lives of a Rajput Queen: Heroic Pasts in India C. 1500–1900. University of Washington Press. ISBN 978-0-295-98760-6.
