= Siege of Chittorgarh (1303) =

Alauddin Khalji's conquest of Chittor

- Part of Wars between the Kingdom of Mewar and the Delhi Sultanate
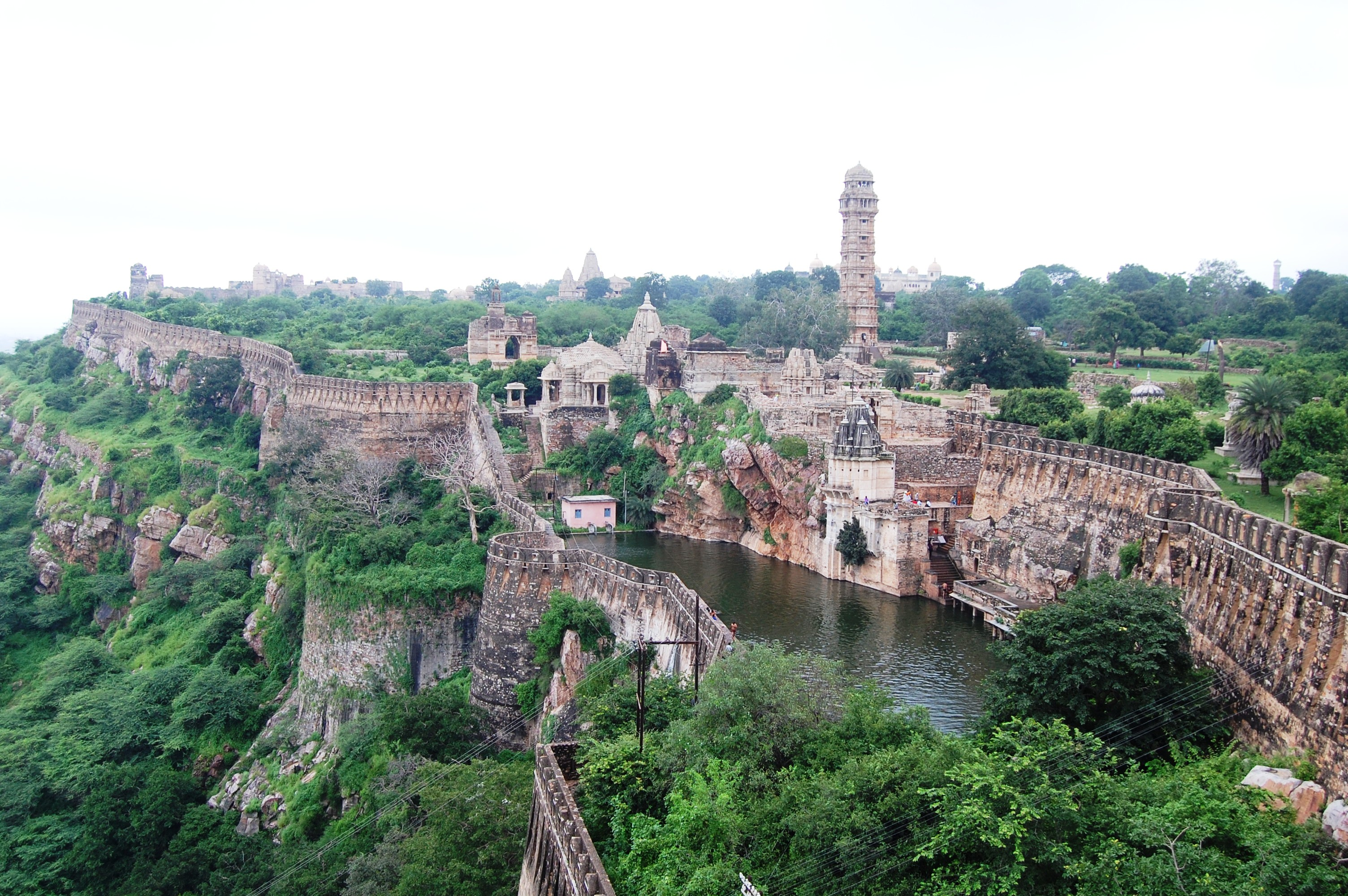
- Chittor Fort in 2011
| Date | 28 January – 26 August 1303 |
| Location | Chittor Fort 24.8863°N 74.647°E |
| Result | Khalji victory |
| Territorial changes | Alauddin Khalji captured the fort of Chittor |

Belligerents
| Delhi Sultanate | Guhila dynasty |

Commanders and leaders
| Alauddin Khalji | Ratnasimha †; Rana Lakhan †; Ari Singh † |

Casualties and losses
| Unknown | 3,000 or 30,000 killed |
- Location of the Siege of Chittorgarh Siege of Chittorgarh (Rajasthan)

In 1303, the Delhi Sultanate ruler Alauddin Khalji captured the Chittor Fort from the Guhila king Ratnasimha, after an eight month long siege. The conflict has been described in several legendary accounts, including the historic epic poem Padmavat, which claims that Alauddin's motive was to obtain king Ratnasimha's beautiful wife Padmavati.

== Background ==
The Mewar region in north-western India was ruled by the Guhila dynasty, whose seat was located at the Chittor Fort (Chittorgarh). In 1299, Alauddin's general Ulugh Khan had raided the Mewar region on his way to Gujarat. However, this appears to have been a light raid rather than a serious invasion. The Guhila king Samarasimha protected his country from the raiders, possibly by paying a tribute.

In 1301, Alauddin conquered Ranthambore, which was located between Delhi and Chittor, and then returned to Delhi. The same year, Ratnasimha ascended the throne of Chittor. The later legends based on Malik Mohammad Jaisi's epic poem Padmavat state that Alauddin invaded Chittor to obtain Rani Padmini, the queen of Ratnasimha (called Ratan Sen or Ratan Singh in these legends). According to these legends, a man named Raghava told Alauddin about the extraordinary beauty of Padmini. However, Padmini does not find a mention in the earliest records of Alauddin's conquest of Chittor, such as the chronicles by Amir Khusrau, Barani and Isami. Most modern historians have rejected the authenticity of the Padmini legend.

== Siege ==
On 28 January 1303, Alauddin started his march to Chittor with a large army. After arriving near the fort, he set up a camp between the Berach and Gambhiri rivers. His army then surrounded the fort from all sides. Alauddin stationed himself at Chitori hillock located to the north of the fort.

The siege went on for nearly eight months, suggesting that the defenders put up a strong resistance. Amir Khusrau, who accompanied Alauddin to Chittor, has briefly described the siege in his Khaza'in ul-Futuh. However, no detailed account of the siege operations is available. Khusrau implies that the frontal attacks by the invaders failed twice. He states that the invaders managed to reach the "waist" of the hill during the two months of the rainy season but could not advance further. Alauddin ordered the fort to be pelted with stones from siege engines (munjaniqs). At the same time, his armoured soldiers attacked it from all sides.

The fort garrison may have suffered from a famine or an epidemic. On 26 August 1303, Alauddin entered the fort. After his victory, Alauddin ordered a general massacre of Chittor's population. According to Amir Khusrau, 30,000 Hindus were "cut down like dry grass" due to this order. Conversely, Banarsi Prasad Saxena states that the figure of 30,000 is probably an exaggeration and inaccurate as three and thirty are presented similarly in Persian annals.

After the fortress was sacked, Rajput women committed Jauhar while most of the warriors died defending the fort. While the exact site of where the Jauhar was committed is unknown, Historian R.V Somani speculated that it took place near Gaumukh Kund or inside the palaces.

=== Fate of Ratnasimha ===
Accounts vary about what happened to Ratnasimha, the ruler of Chittor. The early Muslim chroniclers such as Amir Khusrau, Ziauddin Barani and Isami, state that the unnamed ruler ("Rai") of Chittor surrendered to Alauddin and was pardoned. The Jain writer Kakka Suri (1336) states that Alauddin took away his wealth, and "made him move like a monkey from one city to another".

The Kumbhalgarh prashasti (eulogistic inscription) of 1460 CE, which is the earliest Hindu record of the siege, states that Ratnasimha "departed" from the battlefield, after which Lakshmasimha died defending the fort because only the cowards forsake "the established traditions of the family", while "those who are valorous and steady do not give up their pursuit." Modern historians have interpreted the word "departed" (tasmin gate in Sanskrit) variously, either meaning that Ratnasimha died fighting on the battlefield or deserted the defenders and surrendered.

The Padmavat legend claims that Ratnasimha ("Ratan Sen") died in a combat with the ruler of Kumbhalner, before Alauddin's conquest of the fort. In Nainsi ri Khyat, the 17th century chronicler Muhnot Nainsi, who wrote under Rajput patronage, states that Ratnasimha died on the battlefield.

== Aftermath ==
The city of Chittor was completely sacked by Alauddin's army. A large number of temples were desecrated, including the long-standing Sun temple dedicated to Hindu goddess Kali, where the icon of Surya (solar deity of Hindus) was vandalized. However, most of these temples were repaired by rulers of the junior Sisodia lineage, only to be desecrated again by Bahadur Shah and Akbar, when they sacked the city in 1535 and 1568 respectively.

Alauddin assigned Chittor to his son Khizr Khan (or Khidr Khan), who was 7 or 8 years old. The Chittor fort was renamed "Khizrabad" after the prince. Khizr Khan was given a gold-embroidered robe and a red canopy, which was usually bestowed upon an heir apparent. Alauddin stayed at Chittor for seven more days and then left for Delhi, probably after learning about the Mongol invasion. An important inscription at Chittor dated 13 May 1310, recording Alauddin as the ruler, indicates that the place had not been evacuated by the Khaljis till that period.

As Khizr Khan was only a child, the actual administration was handed over to a slave named Malik Shahin, who held the office of naib-i barbek (deputy in-charge of the royal court), and whom Alauddin called his son. According to the 14th-century chronicler Isami, Malik Shahin fled the fort sometime later because he was afraid of the Vaghela king Karna, who had managed to recapture the neighbouring Gujarat region after Alauddin's 1299 invasion.

Later, Alauddin decided that it was best to govern Chittor indirectly through a Hindu ruler. He transferred the governance of Chittor from Khizr Khan to the Chahamana chief Maladeva (Maldeo), who was supported by the locals. Maladeva was a brother of the Kanhadadeva. He had saved Alauddin's life from an accident during Alauddin's siege of Kanhadadeva's Jalore fort. He contributed 5,000 horsemen and 10,000 infantrymen to Alauddin's campaigns, whenever ordered. He used to bring gifts for Alauddin during his annual visit to the imperial court, where he was honoured in return. Alauddin maintained an imperial garrison at Chittor, and one of his inscriptions (dated May 1310) has been discovered there.

According to the 16th-century chronicler Firishta, when Alauddin was on his deathbed, the ruler of Chittor rebelled and executed the imperial soldiers stationed in the fort. After the death of Maladeva around 1321, the fort came under the control of Hammir Singh, a ruler of the Sisodia branch of the Guhilas. However, historian Peter Jackson believes that the fort remained under the control of the governors dispatched from Delhi, even during the reigns of the first two Tughluq rulers (1321–1350), as suggested by epigraphic evidence. According to Jackson, the accounts about Maladeva and Sisodias originated from a Sanskrit epic and seemed to be inaccurate.

== See also ==
- Siege of Chittorgarh (1567–1568)
- Siege of Chittorgarh (1535)
