= Padmavat =

16th century Awadhi epic

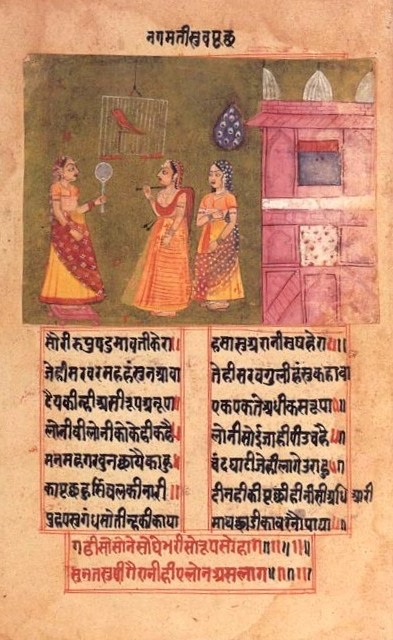
- "Queen Nagmati rashly asks her new parrot who is more beautiful, she or his former owner Princess Padmavati of Sri Lanka. Naturally, she gets a displeasing answer." An illustrated manuscript of Padmavat, c. 1750
- Author: Malik Muhammad Jayasi
- Language: Persian and Awadhi
- Genre: Historical Fiction; Epic poetry
- Set in: 13th–14th century India
- Published: 1540
- Publication place: India
- Text: Padmavat at Wikisource

Padmavat (or Padmawat) is an epic poem written in 1540 by Sufi poet Malik Muhammad Jayasi, who wrote it in the Awadhi language, and originally in the Persian Nastaʿlīq script. It is the oldest extant text among the important works in Awadhi. A famous piece of Sufi literature from the period, it relates an allegorical fictional story about Delhi Sultan Alauddin Khalji's desire for the titular Padmavati, the Queen of Chittor based on historic conquest of chittor. Alauddin Khalji and Padmavati's husband Ratan Sen are historical figures, whereas Padmavati may have been a fictional character.

== Plot ==
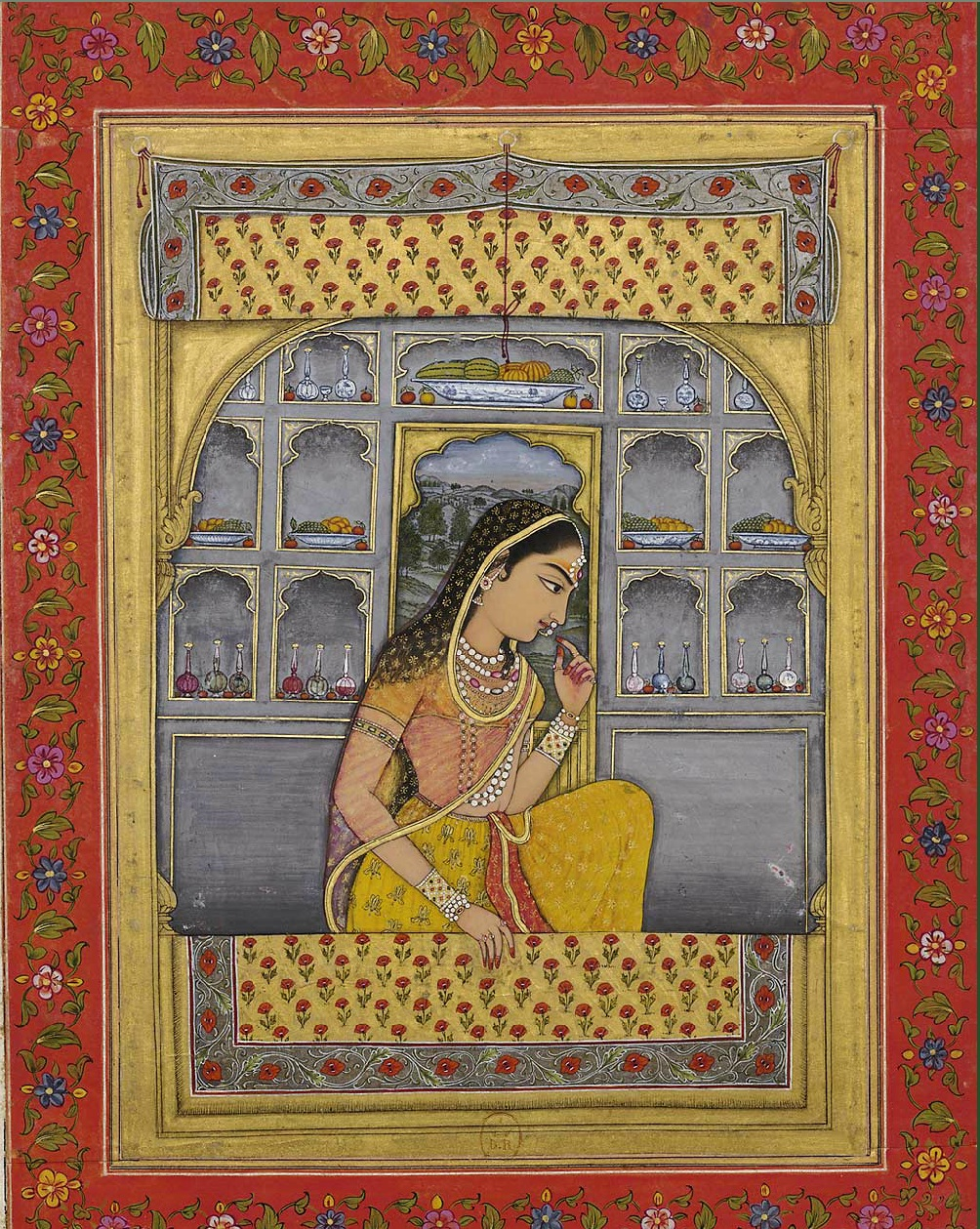
Rani Padmini, popularly referred to as Padmavati. c. 1765

Padmavati, the princess of the Singhal kingdom, is close friends with the talking parrot Hiraman. Her father disapproves of their closeness, and orders the parrot to be killed. The parrot flies away to escape the punishment, but is captured by a bird catcher, and ultimately ends up as a pet of the Chittor ruler Ratansen.

Inspired by the parrot's description of Padmavati's beauty, Ratansen decides to visit the Singhal kingdom. Joined by his 16,000 vassals and princes, and with the parrot as his guide, he reaches Singhal after crossing the seven seas. There, he tries to win Padmavati by performing austerities in a temple. Informed by the parrot, Padmavati visits the temple and returns without meeting Ratansen, although she begins to long for him. Meanwhile, at the temple, Ratansen decides to commit suicide for having missed her. The deities Shiva and Parvati intervene, and Shiva advises him to attack the fortress of Singhal.

Disguised as ascetics, Ratansen and his followers attack the fortress, but are captured by Gandharvsen. As Ratansen is about to be executed, his bard reveals his identity. Gandharvsen then marries Padmavati to Ratansen, and also arranges 16,000 padmini women for his companions. (Padmini is best among the four types of women, typically found only in Singhal.)

As Padmavati and Ratansen consummate their marriage in Singhal, Ratansen's first wife Nagmati longs for him in Chittor. She uses a bird to send a message to Singhal, following which Ratansen decides to return to Chittor. Ratansen has excessive pride in being married to the most beautiful woman on the earth, for which he is punished by a sea storm during the return journey. He and Padmavati are rescued by the Ocean, but all their followers die in the storm. Lakshmi, the daughter of the Ocean, tests Ratansen's love for Padmavati by appearing before him disguised as Padmavati. Ratansen passes the test, and is rewarded with gifts by the Ocean and Lakshmi. With these gifts, he recruits a new entourage at Puri, and returns to Chittor.

In Chittor, Padmavati and Nagmati vie for Ratansen's attention. Initially, he placates them by spending nights with them alternately, but then establishes peace by reprimanding them. Meanwhile, he banishes the Brahmin courtier Raghav Chetan for fraudulently winning a contest. Padmavati gifts Raghav her bangle in order to placate him.

Raghav goes to the court of Alauddin Khalji in Delhi. When asked about the bangle, he describes the unmatched beauty of Padmavati. Alauddin then besieges Chittor, and demands Padmavati for himself. Ratansen rejects the demand, offering to pay a tribute instead. Alauddin rejects the offer, and the siege continues. Finally, as part of fresh terms of peace, Ratansen invites Alauddin as a guest inside the fort, against the advice of his vassals Gora and Badal. Alauddin deceitfully catches a glimpse of Padmavati, captures Ratansen, and returns to Delhi.

Padmavati asks Gora and Badal to help her free Ratansen. The two men and their followers enter the fortress of Delhi, disguised as Padmavati and her companions. They free Ratansen, but Gora is killed fighting during the escape, while Badal takes Ratansen to Chittor.

During Ratansen's absence, the Kumbhalner ruler Devpal Singh proposes marriage to Padmavati. On his return, Ratansen learns about this, and decides to punish Devpal. In the ensuing single combat, Ratansen and Devpal kill each other. Meanwhile, Alauddin's army reaches Chittor. Facing a certain defeat, Nagmati and Padmavati along with other women of the fort commit suicide by jauhar (mass self-immolation), while the men fight to death. Alauddin captures an empty fortress, thus denied his prize.

Alauddin reflects on his Pyrrhic victory, and the nature of insatiable desire and says, "Desire is insatiable, permanent / but this world is illusory and transient / Insatiable desire man continues to have / Till life is over and he reaches his grave."

== Manuscripts ==
The earliest extant manuscripts of Padmavat vary considerably in length, and are written in a number of different scripts, including Kaithi, Nagari and Nastaʿlīq.

The Nastaʿlīq manuscripts form the oldest layer of the text. The earliest extant manuscript of Padmavat is a Nastaliq manuscript copied in 1675 in Amroha, by Muhammad Shakir. It was discovered in Rampur, and contains interlinear Persian translations. Other Persian manuscripts include the ones copied by Rahimdad Khan of Shahjahanpur (1697) and Abdulla Ahmad Khan Muhammad of Gorakhpur (1695).

The Kaithi manuscripts contain a large number of additional verses, and are often incomplete or poorly transcribed.

Mataprasad Gupta published a critical edition of the text, based on five different manuscripts, the earliest of which is from the 17th century.

== Translations and adaptations ==
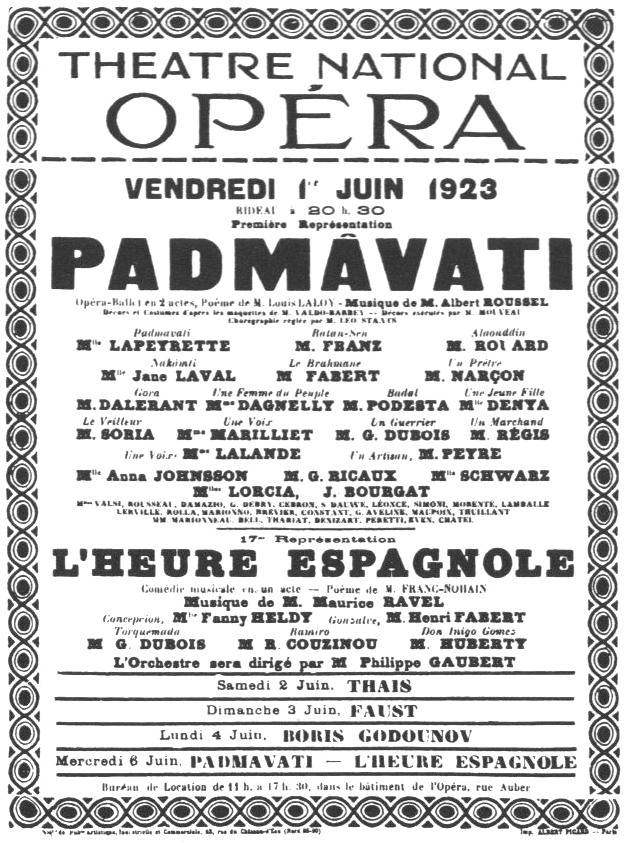
Cover of French Opera Padmâvatî. c. 1923

The earliest known adaptation of Padmavat is Prem Nama (1590) of Hansa Dakkani, a court poet of Ibrahim Adil Shah II of Bijapur Sultanate.

Twelve adaptations of Padmavat exist in Persian and Urdu. The most famous of these are Rat-Padam and Shama-wa-parwanah. The Rat-Padam (1618) of Mulla Abdul Shakur or Shaikh Shukrullah Bazmi of Gujarat follows the plot of Padmavat closely, but omits the Sufi symbolism for characters and events. The Shama-wa-parwanah (1658) of Aqil Khan Razi (a governor of Delhi under Aurangzeb) retains the Sufi symbolism.

The Bengali epic Padmavati written in the 17th century by Alaol was influenced by this. It inspired a number of novels, plays and poems in 19th-century Bengali literature. It also had Bengali adaptations by Kshirode Prasad Vidyavinode in 1906 and Abanindranath Tagore in 1909.

Padmavat is the ultimate source of Albert Roussel's opera Padmâvatî (1923).

One of the famous Burmese literatures, မင်းကုသနှင့်ပပဝတီ (Minkutha & Papawati) is a loose adaptation of the Padmavati story, being adapted into several versions of theater plays and books.

Early cinematic adaptations include the Tamil film Chittoor Rani Padmini (1963) and the Hindi film Maharani Padmini (1964). Padmaavat (2018), a Bollywood Indian film directed by Sanjay Leela Bhansali, is based on the Padmavat.

== Historicity ==
The late medieval Persian historians such as Firishta and Hajiuddabir treated the Padmavat legend as history, but their accounts suffer from inconsistencies. The later Rajput bards also adapted and expanded the legend, without consideration to historical facts. Hemratan's Gora Badal Padmini Chaupai (c. 1589 CE) became the first popular Rajput adaptation of the legend. Between 16th and 18th centuries, more Rajput versions of the Padmavati legend were compiled in present-day Rajasthan, under the patronage of the Rajput chiefs. Most medieval histories written after Firishta (16th century), including the 18th century Bahrulamvaj, mention the Padmavati episode. The close resemblances in the various legendary narratives about Padmavati indicate that all these accounts are based on Jaisi's Padmavat. Niccolao Manucci also mentions the story in his Storia do Mogor, but places it during the 16th century king Akbar's invasion of Chittor.

While some historians reject it as a product of poet's imagination other gives credibility of the historical events described in the text. Historian Kishori Saran Lal points out several inconsistencies in the Padmavat legend. For example, that Ratnasimha had ascended the throne in 1301, and was defeated by Alauddin in 1303 whereas Padmavat claims that Ratnasimha spent 12 years in quest of Padmavati, and then 8 years in conflict with Alauddin. Lal also points out the inconsistencies in the narratives of the later medieval historians. For example, Firishta states that Alauddin ordered his son Khizr Khan to evacuate Chittor in 1304, and then appointed a nephew of Ratnasimha as its new governor. However, Khizr Khan left Chittor much after 1304. According to Lal, Jaisi himself suggests that Padmavat is meant to be an allegory, not a narration of a historical event, because the author mentions that in his narrative, Chittor stands for the body, Raja (Ratnasimha) for the mind, Singhal for the heart, Padmavati for wisdom, and Alauddin for lust. Lal concludes that the only historical facts in the legend are that Alauddin captured Chittor, and that the women of the fort (including a queen of Ratnasimha) died in jauhar. Banarsi Prasad Saksena believes that even the jauhar narrative is a fabrication: the contemporary chronicler Amir Khusrau refers to the jauhar during the earlier conquest of Ranthambore, but does not mention any jauhar at Chittor. According to JNU professor Aditya Mukherjee, in "the contemporary period, there is no mention of this event, no accounts of Padmavati by Amir Khusrau, a prolific writer of the era and a courtier of Alauddin Khilji." He states that there "is no historical evidence of this Padmavati event - this story is a poet's imagination". Although Khusrau doesn't explicitly mentioned "Padmavati" or "Padmini" , he however have referred Khilji as Solomon and himself as Hudhud-the parrot who brought the news of the beautiful queen to the fabled king. Regarding the historicity of Padmini's (Padmavati) story, historian S. Roy wrote in The History and Culture of the Indian People that "...... Abu-'l Fazl definitely says that he gives the story of Padminī from "ancient chronicles", which cannot obviously refer to the Padmāvat, an almost contemporary work. ...... it must be admitted that there is no inherent impossibility in the kernel of the story of Padminī devoid of all embellishments, and it should not be totally rejected off-hand as a myth. But it is impossible, at the present state of our knowledge, to regard it definitely as a historical fact."
