= Chittod Ki Rani Padmini Ka Johur =

2009 Indian television series

- Created by: Chandrakant Productions
- Country of origin: India
- Original language: Hindi
- No. of episodes: 48

Production
- Producers: Nitin; Chandrakant Desai
- Running time: 24 minutes

Original release
- Network: Sony Entertainment Television
- Release: 25 May – 13 August 2009

Chittod Ki Rani Padmini Ka Johur (Hindi pronunciation: [tʃɪttɔːɽ kiː raːniː pədmənɪ kaː dʒɔːɦər], transl. The Jauhar of the Queen Padmini of Chittod) is an Indian historical drama television series that aired on Sony Entertainment Television, based on the life of Rani Padmini, the 14th-century queen of Chittod, Mewar, Rajasthan. The drama premiered on 25 May 2009.

The series is produced by Nitin Chandrakant Desai. ₹60 million was spent over creating the sets and ₹25 million for costumes and jewellery.

== Plot ==
The initial parts of the drama takes place sometime before 1302 AD. Princess Padmavati is the daughter of the King Ratnasen of Singhaldweep. She falls in love with Rana Ratan Singh, the heir to the throne of Chittod, Rajputana who comes to Singhaldweep after seeing a painting of her in his palace made by Chittod's painter / musician Raghav Chetan. He wins the princess's marriage contest, defeating warrior Padam Singh (which is actually Padmavati in disguise) in a sword fight and asking her to marry him, without the permission of his own parents. After much debate, Padmavati and Ratan Singh are wed together with the blessings of Padmavati's parents and all of Singhaldweep. Padmavati is permanently renamed "Padmini" by her husband, Ratan Singh, who then leave for Chittod along with a royal procession.

In Chittod, Princess Naagmati, Ratan Singh's first wife and his child, Yashovardhan's mother, opposes this second marriage and Padmini's entry in the royal palace. She appeals to the Queen of Chittod, her mother-in-law and former rival, to protest against her husband's adultery persuading her to forget their own quarrels and join hands together to "destroy" Padmini. On his wedding night, Naagmati forever forbids her husband to go to Padmini's palace after dusk and thereby stopping him from loving Rani Padmini, in exchange for letting him see his son. Under pretenses of "Chittod's long-lasting palace traditions," Naagmati organizes various contests against Padmini, only to lose each time.

Parallel to this story is the tale of North India's then ruler Sultan Ala-ud-din Khalji, usurper of his uncle's throne through deceit and murder, who is now intent on conquering Rajputana and its kingdoms (including Chittod).

== Cast ==
- Tejaswini Lonari as Rani Padmini
- Rohit Bakshi as Ratnasimha
- Mukesh Rishi as Alauddin Khalji
- Aarya Dharmchand Kumar as Kunwar Gajendra Singh, the Prince of Chittod
