= Gora Badal =

Rajput warriors

Gora and Badal were two Rajput warriors, namely Gora Singh and Badal Singh, whose story appears in the medieval Indian texts Padmavat (1540 CE), Gora Badal Padmini Chaupai (1589 CE), and their later adaptions. They served the king of Chittor, Ratansen (identified with Ratnasimha, also called Rawal Ratan Singh in later legends). Songara Chauhan Gora and Badal were the Uncle-Nephew (Kaka bhatija) duo who hailed from the Songara Chauhan kingdom of Jalore.

When Alauddin Khalji of Delhi attacked Chittor to obtain Ratansen's wife Padmavati and captured the king. Gora, Badal, and their soldiers entered Delhi disguised as Padmini and her dasis (female servants) and launched a surprise attack on them.

Gora and Badal both died fighting bravely in this campaign. Badal escorted the king to Chittor safely but was later killed in the same campaign. Both of these warriors are popular and well known in Rajasthan through folk tales, and there are traditional songs and paintings depicting their bravery and courage.

== Padmavat ==
In Malik Muhammad Jayasi's Padmavat (1540 CE), Gora and Badal are vassals of Ratansen, the king of Chittor (identified with Ratnasimha). Alauddin Khalji of Delhi attacks Chittor to obtain Ratansen's beautiful wife Padmavati. During a peace negotiation, Ratansen invites Alauddin as a guest inside the fort, against the advice of Gora and Badal. Alauddin deceitfully catches a glimpse of Padmavati, captures Ratansen, and returns to Delhi. Padmavati asks Gora and Badal to help her free Ratansen. The two men and their followers enter the fortress of Delhi, disguised as Padmavati and her companions. They free Ratansen, but Gora is killed fighting during the escape, while Badal takes Ratansen to Chittor.

== Gora Badal Padmini Chaupai ==
Hemratan's Gora Badal Padmini Chaupai (1589 CE) follows a similar plot: Alauddin invades Chittor to obtain Ratan Sen's wife Padmini, and deceitfully captures Ratan Sen.. The frightened nobles of Chittor consider surrendering Padmini to Alauddin. But warriors Gora (or Goru) and Badal (or Badil) agree to defend her and rescue King Ratansen. They pretend to make arrangements to bring Padmavati to Alauddin's camp, but instead bring warriors concealed in palanquins. They rescue the king; Gora dies fighting Alauddin's army, while Badal escorts the king back to the Chittor fort. Gora's wife commits self-immolation (sati). In heaven, Gora is rewarded with half of Indra's throne.
