= Ratnasimha =

King of Mewar from 1302 to 1303

- Maharajakula; Rawal

King of Mewar
- Reign: c. 1302–26 August 1303
- Predecessor: Samarasimha
- Died: 1303 (disputed) (Note: Ratnasimha may have died in battle of 1303 or fled. See § Fate after defeat for more detail.)
- Spouse: Nagmati; Padmini (according to Padmavat)
- Dynasty: Guhila
- Father: Rawal Samarsimha
- Religion: Hinduism

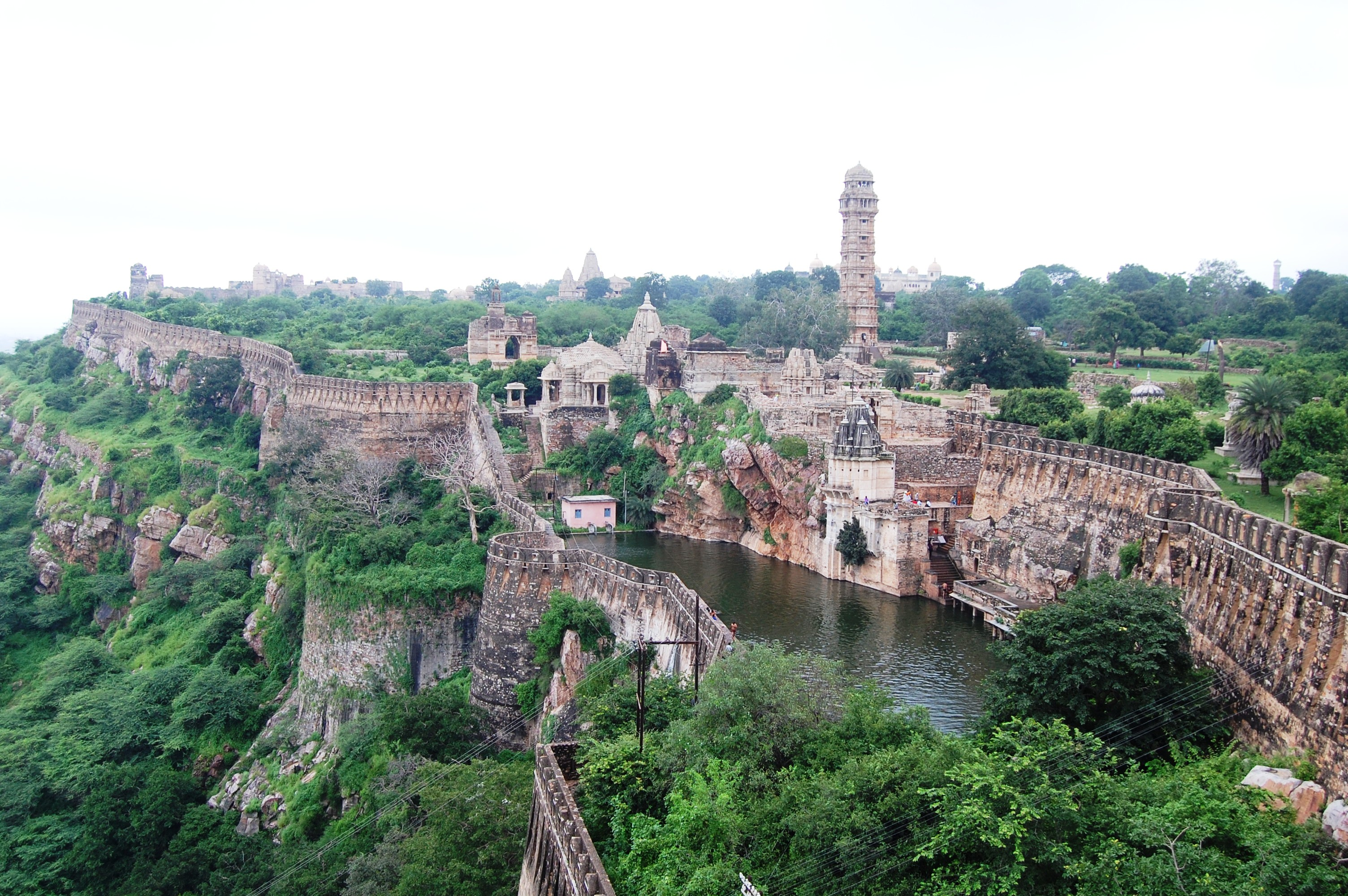
Chittor Fort was the capital of Mewar and is located in the present-day town of Chittorgarh

Ratnasimha (IAST: Ratna-Siṃha, r. c. 1302–03 CE) was a ruler of the Kingdom of Mewar in present-day Rajasthan, India. He belonged to the Rawal branch of the Guhila dynasty, which ruled from the Chitrakuta fort (modern Chittorgarh). The last ruler of this branch, he was defeated by Alauddin Khalji during the Siege of Chittorgarh in 1303 CE.

The Rajasthani legends mention him as the Rajput ruler Rawal Ratan Singh. A fictionalized version of him appears as Ratan Sen in Malik Muhammad Jayasi's Padmavat. According to this poem, Alauddin Khalji attacked Chittorgarh to obtain Ratan Singh's beautiful wife Rani Padmini; Alauddin captured the fort after Ratan Sen died in a combat with king Devpal of Kumbhalner; subsequently, Padmini and other women committed Jauhar to protect their honour. The historicity of this legend is disputed.

== Ascension ==
Delhi and Chittor in present-day India

Ratnasimha succeeded his father Samarasimha as the Guhila ruler of Mewar around 1302 CE. He belonged to the Rawal branch of the family, which ruled from Chitrakuta fort (now known as Chittorgarh).

Ratnasimha is attested by the 1302 CE (1359 VS) Dariba temple inscription, which records a gift of 16 drammas (coins) to the temple during his reign. The inscription mentions his title as Maharajakula (which appears as Maharawal in colloquial literature).

A few coins issued by Ratnasimha have also been discovered.

== Defeat against Alauddin Khalji ==
In 1303, Alauddin Khalji, the Sultan of Delhi, invaded Chittor. After reaching the foot of the Chittor hill, two wings of his army attacked the fort from two different sides. After two months of unsuccessful siege, the attackers pelted stones on the fort using manjaniqs (mangonels), but still failed to capture the fort. Finally, on 26 August 1303, the invaders managed to enter the fort.

== Fate after defeat ==
According to Amir Khusrau, who claims to have entered the fort with Alauddin, the ruler ("Rai") of Chittor surrendered to Alauddin. The Delhi Sultan massacred 30,000 other Hindus, but pardoned the ruler and his family. He assigned the fort to his young son Khizr Khan with Malik Shahin as the actual administrator, renamed it to Khizrabad, and then returned to Delhi.

On the day the yellow-faced Rai sought refuge in the red canopy from fear of the green swords, the great Emperor (May his prosperity continue!) was still crimson with rage. But when he saw the vegetarian Rai trembling with fear, like the trampled and withered grass under the Imperial tent — though the Rai was a rebel, yet the breeze of royal mercy did not allow any hot wind to blow upon him. All the storm of the Emperor's wrath vented itself against the other rebels. He ordered that wherever a green Hindu was found, he was to be cut down like dry grass. Owing to this stern order, thirty thousand Hindus were slain in one day. It seemed that the meadows of Khizrabad had grown men instead of grass.

— Amir Khusrau's Khazain ul-Futuh

Khusrau's account is also corroborated by the 14th century Muslim chroniclers Ziauddin Barani and Isami. Historian Banarsi Prasad Saksena believes that Khusrau's account is correct. Kishori Saran Lal, on the other hand, doubts this account, arguing that it seems improbable that Alauddin spared the life of Chittor's ruler while ordering a massacre of 30,000 other Hindus.

The Jain writer Kakka Suri, in his Nabhinandana-Jinoddhara-Prabandha (1336 CE) states:

He [Alauddin] captured the lord of Citrakūṭa fort, took away his property, and made him move like a monkey from one city to another.

— Nabhi-nandana-jinoddhara-prabandha by Kakka Suri (1336)

According to historian Dasharatha Sharma, this suggests that the ruler of Chitrakuta (IAST: Citrakūṭa i.e. Chittor) survived the siege, and corroborates the accounts of the Muslim chroniclers.

The earliest Hindu account of the event is the Kumbhalgarh prashasti (eulogistic inscription) of 1460 CE. This inscription was issued by Kumbhakarna of the Guhila family's Rana branch, who were a rival of Ratnasimha's Rawal branch. The inscription states:

That ruler [Samarasiṃha] with all his sins removed by the worship of Maheśa became the lord of svarga, after entrusting the defence of Mount Chitrakuta to his son Ratnasiṃha. When he [Ratnasiṃha] had departed, Lakṣmasiṃha of the family of Khummana defended that excellent fort, (for) even though the established traditions of the family be forsaken by cowards, those who are valorous and steady do not give up their pursuit. Having thus destroyed his enemies in battle, he [Lakṣmasiṃha] died purified by weapons while defending Chitrakuta.

— Kumbhalgarh inscription of Kumbhakarna

The inscription mentions the title of Ratnasimha and his predecessors as "Rāula", thus indicating that they belonged to the Rawal branch. However, Lakshmasimha (IAST: Lakṣmasiṃha) is explicitly called a "Mahārāṇā", thus indicating that he belonged to the Rana branch.

The word "departed" (tasmin gate in Sanskrit) in this verse has been variously interpreted as "died" or "deserted the defenders". Historian Gaurishankar Hirachand Ojha interpreted this verse to suggest that Ratnasimha bravely fought till death. Some other scholars such as Kalika Ranjan Qanungo and R. B. Haldar also accepted Ojha's translation.

However, according to other historians such as Akshay Kirti Vyas and R. C. Majumdar, the verse means that Ratnasimha cowardly fled from the battlefield. Subimal Chandra Datta points out that while describing the death of Lakshmasimha, the inscription states that he "departed for heaven". But while describing Ratnasimha's departure, it simply mentions that he "departed". This, combined with the surrender of the "Rai" described in the Muslim accounts, suggests that Ratnasimha departed from the battlefield and surrendered to Alauddin.

The 16th century Padmavat legend claims that Ratnasimha ("Ratan Sen") died in a combat with the ruler of Kumbhalner, before Alauddin's conquest of the fort. The 17th-century chronicler Muhnot Nainsi in his Nainsi ri Khyat, who wrote under Rajput patronage, states that Ratnasimha ("Ratan Singh") died on the battlefield.

== The legend of Padmini ==
Padmini's purported palace

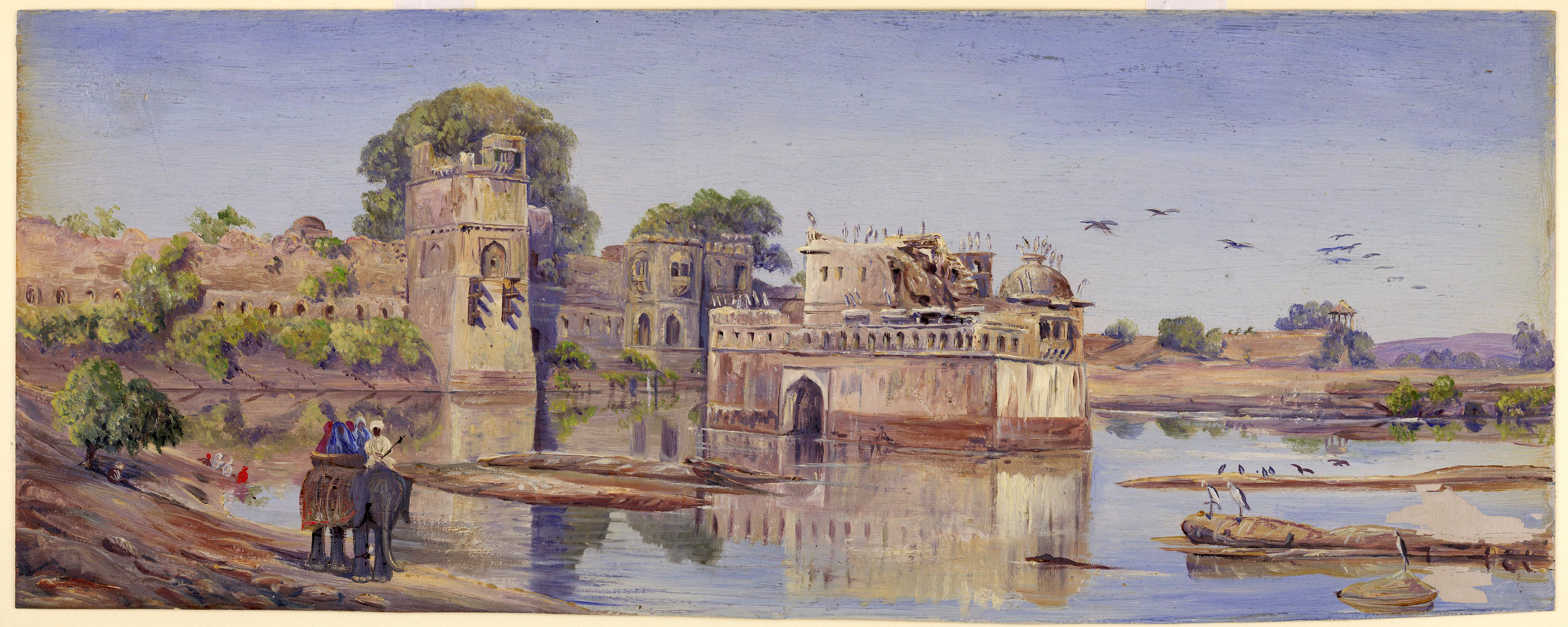
An 1878 painting

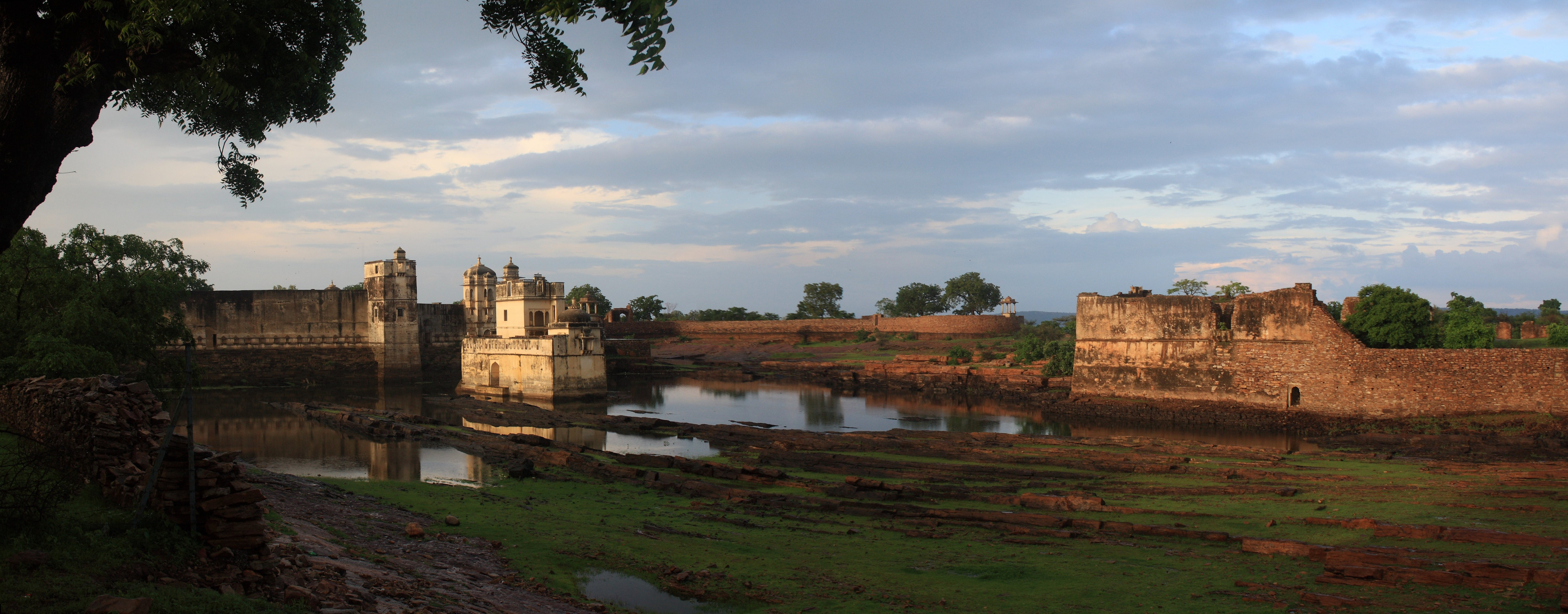
A 2010 photograph

A legendary account of Ratan Singh (as Ratan Sen) appears in Malik Muhammad Jayasi's 16th century epic poem Padmavat. According to this account, he married the Sinhala princess Padmini after a quest. Alauddin Khalji invaded Chittor to obtain Padmini, after hearing of her beauty. Ratan Sen was captured by the Delhi forces, but his Rajput warriors rescued him on Padmini's request. While he was in captivity, his Rajput neighbour - Devpal of Kumbhalner - sent a marriage proposal to Padmini. Ratan Sen fought with Devpal to avenge this insult, and the two Rajput kings killed each other in a single combat. Alauddin then invaded Chittor, but before he could capture the fort, Padmini (Padmavati) and other women immolated themselves.

Several adaptions of the Padmavat legend appeared in the later years. The 16th-century historians Firishta and Haji-ud-Dabir were among the earliest writers to mention Padmini as a historical figure, but their accounts differ with each other and with that of Jayasi. For example, according to Firishta, Padmini was a daughter (not wife) of Ratan Sen. Some other medieval legends written under Rajput patronage state that the contemporary ruler of Chittor was Lakhamsi (Lakshmasimha), and Ratan Sen (Ratnasimha) was his younger brother. Another version, compiled by James Tod, states that Padmini was the wife of Lakhamsi's uncle Bhimsi (Bhimasimha); this version does not mention Ratan Sen at all.

=== Historicity ===
Historian Kalika Ranjan Qanungo, in his A Critical Analysis of the Padmini Legend (1960), proposed that there were actually four distinct people with similar names. According to him, the medieval bards confused and linked these four individuals:

1. Ratnasimha, the Guhila ruler mentioned in the Kumbhalgarh inscription
2. Ratnasen, mentioned as Ratan Sen in Padmavat; he was actually a ruler of Chitrakoot in modern Uttar Pradesh, not Chittor in Rajasthan
3. Ratna, the son of Kshema; he and another warrior named Bhimasimha were killed in a battle at the foot of the Chittor hill
4. Ratnasimha, the son of the Chahamana ruler Hammira. Lakshmasimha, the ruler of Chittor, gave him shelter at Chittor, prompting Alauddin to attack Chittor

Other historians, such as Jogendra Prasad Singh (1964) and Ram Vallabh Somani (1976) have criticized Qanungo's theory based on the following points:

- The Guhila king Ratnasimha and the Ratan Sen of Padmavat cannot be different persons, given that both are described as kings of Chittor who were defeated by Alauddin Khalji. Jayasi names the father of Ratan Sen as a person other than Samarasimha, but according to Singh this is simply a mistake, resulting from the fact that Jayasi wrote over 200 years later.
- Ratan Sen of Padmavat could not have been a king of present-day Uttar Pradesh, because the text explicitly refers to Chittor of Mewar region, describing Kumbhalgarh as its neighbour.
- Ratna, the son of Kshema, could not have fought against Alauddin: his death is mentioned in a 1273 CE inscription, while Alauddin ascended the throne only in 1296 CE. There is no evidence that Bhimasimha, the person who died fighting alongside him, is same as the Bhim Singh mentioned in the bardic legends.
- It is a mere conjecture that Alauddin attacked Chittor because Lakshmasimha sheltered Hammira's son Ratnasimha. The source for this claim is Surajmal's Vaṃśabhāskara, which is a 19th-century work based on historically unreliable bardic tales. None of the contemporary sources suggest that Hammira had a son named Ratnasimha. Hammira Mahakavya, the earliest biography of Hammira, states that Hammira appointed his minister Jajadeva as the ruler of his kingdom before marching to the battle with Alauddin. If Hammira had a son, he would have appointed his own son (rather than Jajadeva) as his successor. Moreover, Hammira had invaded Chittor in the past, and the relations between the two kingdoms were not cordial enough for Chittor to grant shelter to Hammira's son.

Most modern historians have rejected the authenticity of the Padmini legend.

Regarding the historicity of Padmini's story, historian S. Roy wrote in The History and Culture of the Indian People that "...... Abu-'l Fazl definitely says that he gives the story of Padminī from "ancient chronicles", which cannot obviously refer to the Padmāvat, an almost contemporary work. ...... it must be admitted that there is no inherent impossibility in the kernel of the story of Padminī devoid of all embellishments, and it should not be totally rejected off-hand as a myth. But it is impossible, at the present state of our knowledge, to regard it definitely as a historical fact."

== In popular culture ==
- Ratnasimha appears as Ratan Sen in Malik Muhammad Jayasi's epic poem Padmavat (1540).
- Ratnasimha was portrayed by Sivaji Ganesan in Chitrapu Narayana Rao's film Chittoor Rani Padmini (1963).
- In 1988, Rajender Gupta played the role of Ratan Sen in an episode (26) of the Hindi drama series Bharat Ek Khoj, which was based on the book The Discovery of India (1946) by Jawaharlal Nehru.
- Rohit Bakshi portrayed Ratnasimha in Sony Entertainment Television's historical drama Chittod Ki Rani Padmini Ka Johur.
- Shahid Kapoor portrayed Ratan Singh (Ratnasimha) in epic period drama film Padmaavat (2018) directed by Sanjay Leela Bhansali.
