= Ramya Sreenivasan =

Indian scholar

- Education: University of Delhi, Jawaharlal Nehru University
- Awards: Ananda Kentish Coomaraswamy Prize (2009)
- Scientific career
- Fields: English, Early modern Indian history
- Workplaces: University of Pennsylvania
- Thesis: Gender, Literature, History: The Transformation of the Padmini Story (2002)

Ramya Sreenivasan (born 1966) is an Indian scholar of English and early modern Indian history. She is an associate professor in the Department of History at the University of Pennsylvania. She was originally appointed in the Department of South Asian Studies in 2009. Best known for her book The Many Lives of a Rajput Queen, she is a winner of the Ananda Kentish Coomaraswamy Prize.

== Biography ==
Ramya Sreenivasan obtained her BA in English in 1988, followed by an MA in English two years later, both from the University of Delhi. In 2002, she received a PhD in English from the Jawaharlal Nehru University in New Delhi. Her dissertation was titled Gender, Literature, History: The Transformation of the Padmini Story.

== Career ==
Between 1991 and 1998, Sreenivasan was a lecturer in the Department of English at Miranda House, University of Delhi.

Sreenivasan was a visiting lecturer of history at the University of Washington, Seattle, and Kenyon College, Ohio, between 2003 and 2004. She then joined the State University of New York, Buffalo.

=== Research ===
Sreenivasan's doctoral thesis entitled 'Gender, Literature, History: The Transformation of the Padmini Story' was supervised by Prof. G.J.V. Prasad at the Centre of Linguistics and English, School of Languages, at Jawaharlal Nehru University. Rani Padmini, the supposed 14th-century queen of the Rajput kingdom of Chittor – it is not clear if she ever existed – had committed jauhar rather than be captured by the invading Alauddin Khalji, the Sultan of Delhi. Padmini stood for the Rajput ideal of self-sacrificing bravery, mythologised for preferring death to capture by a Muslim. The earliest references to Padmini, however, come from two hundred years after her putative existence, in a poem called Padmavat. Sreenivasan showed that this work, along with other transmissions and translations of other texts, worked to establish a communal or national identity. For Rajputs, in other words, Padmini has achieved a reality to encompass their idea of their own historic valour.

More prosaically, Alauddin reorganised the revenue systems in his sultanate, thereby ruining the fortunes of intermediaries who were previously responsible for the collection of tax. Sreenivasan showed that several of these intermediaries belonged to social groups that would later be called Rajputs. Combining the loss of their finances with their defeats at the hands of invaders, the Rajputs took recourse to epic poetry to establish a sense of pride.

From 2005, Sreenivasan investigated the lives of women and children servants among elite Rajput clans between the sixteenth and the nineteenth centuries, as part of a collaborative research project on South Asian slavery. Sreenivasan showed that slavery among Rajputs comprised not only Indian but also African female slaves. These were exchanged as dowries in a competitive display of wealth, not only to promote interstate alliances but also to elevate the prestige of households. Sreenivasan noted that on the one hand, there was little documentation of slavery, especially of women, in keeping with the Rajputs' notions of female respectability; on the other, for Rajput honour, it was important to play down potentially suspect low-born origins. Thus, unless a slave woman became powerful or committed sati, she was invisible in the records (mainly epic song). Furthermore, contrary to Western distinctions of slavery and family, the boundaries between clan and lineage were fluid, and modified by histories of slavery. Freed slaves could rewrite their pasts to support clan memberships, while illegitimate offspring of Rajputs with lower-caste women would become slaves in turn.

== Selected works ==
=== Articles ===
- Ramya Sreenivasan (2002). "Alauddin Khalji Remembered: Conquest, Gender and Community in Medieval Rajput Narratives". Studies in History. 18 (2). SAGE.
- Ramya Sreenivasan (2004). "Honoring the family: narratives and politics of Rajput kinship in pre-modern Rajasthan". In Indrani Chatterjee (ed.). Unfamiliar Relations: Family and History in South Asia. Permanent Black.
- Ramya Sreenivasan (2005). "Genre, Politics, History: Urdu Traditions of Padmini". In Kathryn Hansen; David Lelyveld (eds.). A Wilderness of Possibilities: Urdu Studies in Transnational Perspective. Oxford University Press.
- Ramya Sreenivasan (2006). "Drudges, Dancing-girls, Concubines: Female Slaves in Rajput Polity, 1500-1850". In Indrani Chatterjee; Richard Eaton (eds.). Slavery and South Asian History. Indiana University Press.
- Ramya Sreenivasan (2014). "Faith and Allegiance in Mughal India: Perspectives from Rajasthan". In Vasudha Dalmia; Munis D. Faruqui (eds.). Religious Interactions in Mughal India. Oxford University Press.
- Ramya Sreenivasan (2014). "Warrior-Tales at Hinterland Courts in North India, c. 1370 – 1550". In Francesca Orsini; Samira Sheikh (eds.). After Timur Left: Culture and Circulation in Fifteenth-Century North India. Oxford University Press.
- Ramya Sreenivasan (2014). "Kingship and Authority Reconsidered: Amber (Rajasthan), circa 1560 – 1615". Journal of the Economic and Social History of the Orient. 57.

=== Books ===
- Ramya Sreenivasan (2007). The Many Lives of a Rajput Queen: Heroic Pasts in India, c. 1500-1900. University of Washington Press. ISBN 978-0295987606.

== Awards ==
Sreenivasan's The Many Lives of a Rajput Queen won the Ananda Kentish Coomaraswamy Prize in 2009.
