= Kshirode Prasad Vidyavinode =

Bengali Indian writer (1863–1927)

- ক্ষীরোদপ্রসাদ বিদ্যাবিনোদ
- Born: 1863; Khardah, Calcutta, British India
- Died: 1927 (aged 63–64); Khardah, Calcutta, British India
- Occupations: Dramatist, novelist, poet Son = Satinath Banerjee

Kshirode Prasad Vidyavinode (Bengali: ক্ষীরোদপ্রসাদ বিদ্যাবিনোদ Kṣīrōda prasāda bidyābhinōḍa) (12 April 1863 – 4 July 1927), born Kshirode Chandra Bhattacharya was a Bengali Indian poet, novelist, dramatist and nationalist.

== Early life and education ==
He was born as Kshirode Chandra Bhattacharya in Khardah on 12 April 1863, to a Brahmin family. He had joined Khardah Banga Vidyalaya and passed his upper primary examination in 1874. Later he joined the Barrackpore Government School, after changing his middle name and became known as Kshirode Prasad Bhattacharya. He passed his entrance examination under the University of Calcutta in 1881, and joined Vidyasagar College and afterwards the General Assembly's Institution, (now known as the Scottish Church College). After earning his postgraduate degree from the University of Calcutta, he joined the Chandernagore Dupleix College as its chemistry teacher, and subsequently taught at his alma mater, the General Assembly's Institution.

== Later life ==
After adopting a different surname Vidyavinode, he embarked on a long and distinguished literary career, and wrote stories, dramas, novels and poems. The thespian on the Bengali stage, Sisir Bhaduri began his professional career with Kshirode Prasad’s play Alamgir. Some of his notable plays were Ali Baba, Banger Pratap Aditya (Pratapaditya of Bengal), Palashir Prayashchitta (The Remorse of Plassey), Nabanarayan and Dada Didi (Brother and Sister). He also edited the journal Aloukik Rahasya (Tales of the Supernatural).

The British colonial regime banned Palashir Prayashchitta and Dada Didi because of their anti-colonial stances. He had joined the movement protesting the partition of Bengal in 1905.

He lived in Bagbazar, north Calcutta, and died on 4 July 1927 in Bankura.

== Commemoration ==
The road Kshirode Vidyavinode Avenue in Bagbazar commemorates his name. Also his bust was installed on the premises of Sri Guru library on the initiative of this library in Khardah, the Khardah municipality and Sutanuti Boimela Committee on 12 April 2012.
