= Cevahir =

Cevahir is a Turkish name and may refer to:

- Bülent Cevahir, Turkish footballer
- Mustafa Cevahir, Turkish footballer
- Cevahir Holding, Turkish holding company based in Istanbul. It operates:
  - Cevahir Mall, shopping mall in Istanbul
  - Cevahir Towers, Skopje, North Macedonia

== See also ==
- Cevahir, Cevher, Dzhokhar, Jauhar, Jawhar, Jawahar, Jawaharlal, al-Jawhari or El-Gohary, Al-Jawhar, Johar, Johari, Johri, Jowhar, Gauhar or Gohar, Gevher, Gevherhan, Govhar, Gowhar, Xhevahir
