= Johar (name) =

Johar is a masculine given name of Perso-Arabic origin (جوهر) , meaning "jewel". and a surname. Notable people with the name include:

== Given name ==
- Johar Ali Khan
- Johar Al Kaabi
- Johar Bendjelloul
- Johar Muhammad
- Johar Noordin

== Surname ==
- Ahmad Johar
- Aranya Johar
- Azlan Johar
- Gita Johar
- I. S. Johar
- Karan Johar
- K. L. Johar
- Mazwan Johar
- Muhammad Bux Johar
- Nasser Al-Johar
- Navtej Johar
- Nigar Johar
- Rajinder Johar
- Yash Johar

== See also ==
- Cevher, Dzhokhar, Jauhar, Jawhar, Jawahar, Jawaharlal, al-Jawhari or El-Gohary, Al-Jawhar, Johar, Johari, Johri, Jowhar, Gauhar or Gohar, Gevher, Gevherhan, Govhar, Gowhar, Xhevahir
