= Al-Jawhar =

Family name

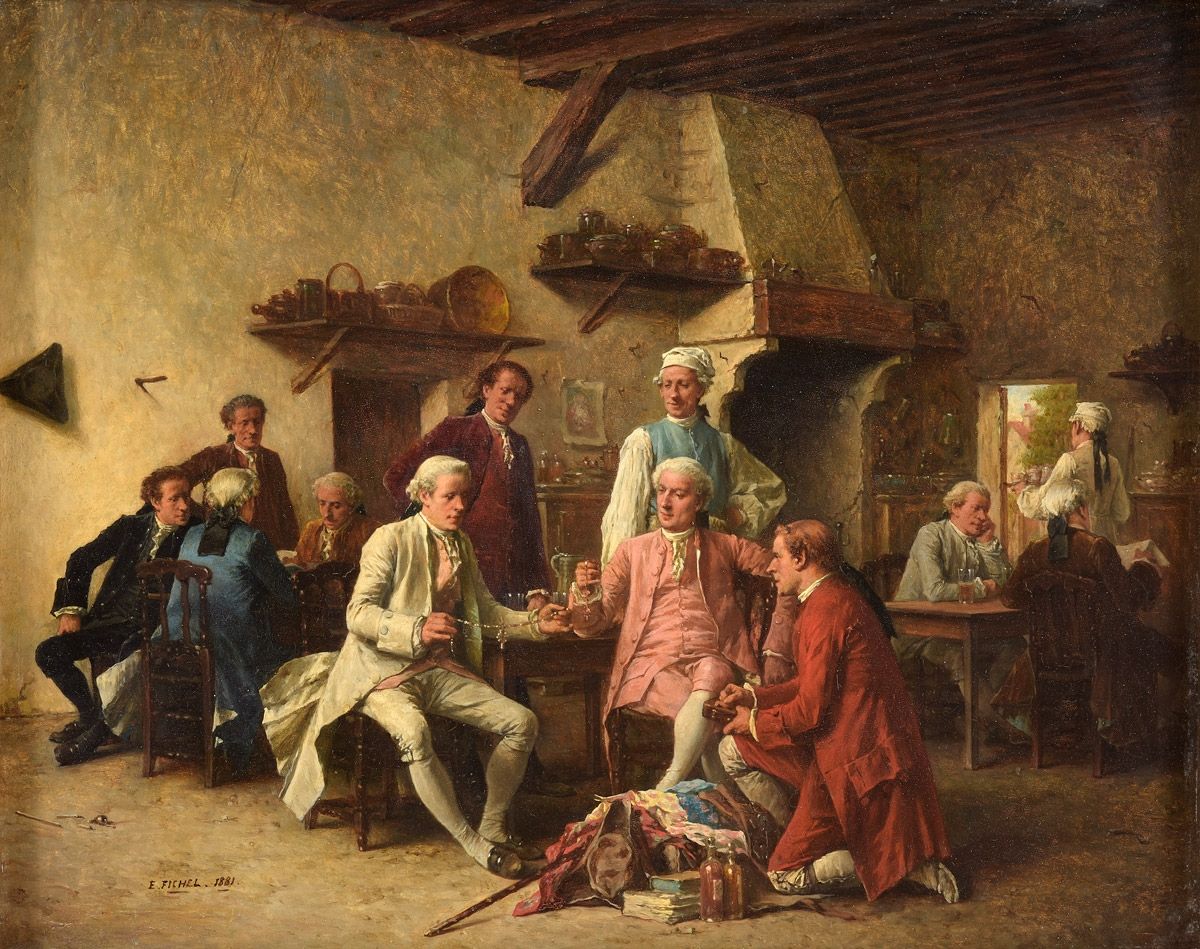
- Artwork depicting a jeweler at work; Al-Jawhar was used as a surname for those with this occupation.
- Pronunciation: /æl dʒaʊhɑːr/

Origin
- Origin: Andalusi Arabic
- Meaning: the jewel
- Region of origin: Middle East

Other names
- Variant forms: Cevahir, Cevher, Dzhokhar, Jauhar, Jawhar, Jawahar, Jawaharlal, al-Jawhari or El-Gohary, Al-Jawhar, Johar, Johari, Johri, Jowhar, Gauhar or Gohar, Gevher, Gevherhan, Govhar, Gowhar, Xhevahir

Al-Jawhar (Andalusian Arabic: الجوهر) is an Arabic surname meaning "the jewel" or "essence." It is primarily found in various regions of the Middle East and among diaspora communities. The surname and its variants have historical and cultural significance, and were used by Jews in the medieval Kingdom of Navarre. Al-Jawhar has been associated with families of prominence in trade, scholarship, and governance.

== Etymology ==
The name derives from the Perso-Arabic word jawhar (جوهر; Greek: ousía), translating to "jewel" or "essence". Historically, it has denoted value, purity, and prominence, and appears in literary and scholarly titles, such as Nazm al-Jawhar, the chronicle of Eutychius of Alexandria.

== People ==
- Abu Nasr al-Jawhari, prominent lexicographer who lived in the 10th century. He is best known for his comprehensive Arabic dictionary, the "Taj al-Lugha wa Sahah al-Arabiya," which was a significant contribution to linguistics.
- Al-Abbās ibn Said al-Jawharī (died c. 860), mathematician who wrote a commentary on Euclid's Elements
- Eliya ibn ʿUbaid (fl. 879–903), Nestorian bishop and writer
- Ibrahim El-Gohary, chief scribe and prime minister of Egypt during the second half of the 18th century.

== See also ==
- Arabic name
- Cevahir, Cevher, Dzhokhar, Jauhar, Jawhar, Jawahar, Jawaharlal, al-Jawhari or El-Gohary, Al-Jawhar, Johar, Johari, Johri, Jowhar, Gauhar or Gohar, Gevher, Gevherhan, Govhar, Gowhar, Xhevahir
