= Govhar =

Govhar (Azerbaijani: Gövhər is an Azerbaijani female given name of Persiqan origin mening "jewel". Notable people with the name include:

- Gövhər ağa, (c. 1790 – 1888) was one of the wives of Jafar Qoli Khan Donboli
- Govhar Bakhshaliyeva, Azerbaijani academic and politician
- Govhar Beydullayeva, Azerbaijani chess Grandmaster
- Govhar Gaziyeva, Azerbaijani stage actress
- Govhar Ibrahimova, Azerbaijani rhythmic gymnast

== See also ==
- Cevher, Dzhokhar, Jauhar, Jawhar, Jawahar, Jawaharlal, al-Jawhari or El-Gohary, Johar, Johari, Johri, Jowhar, Gauhar or Gohar, Gevher, Gevherhan, Govhar, Gowhar, Xhevahir
