= Gohar =

Gohar and Gauhar are given names and surnames. Gawhar is a given name. Also, Gohar (Eastern Armenian) Kohar (Western Armenian) or Goar may be transliterations of the Armenian feminine given name Գոհար. Together with a numer of other names, these names are derived from the Persian gōhar (گُوهَر) meaning "gem, jewel" or "essence, substance". Notable people with the name include:

== Given name ==
=== Goar ===
- Goar Hlgatian (born 1975), Armenian chess player
- Goar Vartanian (1926–2019), Armenian woman who spied for the Soviet Union together with her husband Gevork Vartanian
- Names of Gohar Gasparyan, Gohar Harutyunyan, and other Armenian persons may also be spelled as Goar

=== Gohar ===
- Gohar Ali Shah, Pakistani politician from Mardan District, member of the Khyber Pakhtunkhwa Assembly
- Gohar Dashti (born 1980), Iranian photographer and video artist
- Gohar Faiz (born 1986), Pakistani cricketer
- Gohar Gasparyan (1924–2007), Armenian opera singer
- Gohar Gasparyan (television presenter) (born 1985), Armenian television presenter
- Gohar Harutyunyan (model) (born 1979), Armenian model, Miss Armenia
- Gohar HarutyunyanGohar Harutyunyan, Armenian sports shooter
- Gohar Ayub Khan (1937–2023), Pakistani politician
- Gohar Kheirandish (born 1954), Iranian actress
- Gohar Markosjan-Käsper (1949–2015), Armenian-Estonian writer
- Gohar Mamajiwala (1910–1985), Indian singer, actress, producer and studio owner
- Gohar Muradyan (born 1957), Armenian philologist and translator
- Gohar Nabil (born 1973), Egyptian handball player
- Gohar Rasheed (born 1984), Pakistani actor
- Gohar Shah (born 1995), Pakistani cricketer
- Gohar Yenokyan, Armenian politician, M.P.
- Gohar Zaman (born 1979), Pakistani footballer

=== Gauhar ===
- Gauhar Ara Begum (1631–1706), Mughal princess, daughter of Shah Jahan and Mumtaz Mahal
- Gauhar Afroz (born 1965), also known as Gori, Pakistani retired film actress
- Gauhar Ali (born 1989), Pakistani cricketer
- Gauhar Hafeez (born 1999), Pakistani cricketer
- Gauhar Jaan (1873–1930), Indian singer and dancer
- Gauhar Jamil (1925–1980), Bangladeshi dancer born Ganesh Nath
- Gauhar Raza (born 1956), Indian poet, social activist and documentary filmmaker
- Gauhar Rehman (1936–2003), Pakistani Islamic scholar and politician

=== Gawhar ===
- Gawhar, third wife of Baháʼu'lláh, founder of the Baháʼí Faith religion
- Hajji Gawhar Khanum, first female poet and astronomer of the 19th-century Qajar empire
- Gawhar Shad (died 1457), chief consort of Shah Rukh, ruler of the Timurid Empire

=== Gowhar ===
- Gowhar Khanum, Qajar princess and the daughter of Fath-Ali Shah
- Gowhar Qajar (died 1901), Iranian poetess and astronomer of the Qajar era

== Surname ==
=== Gohar ===
- Ali Gohar, birth name of Shah Alam II (1728–1806), Mughal emperor
- Ali Gohar (born 1956), Pakistani scholar and restorative justice expert
- Bushra Gohar (born 1961), Pakistani politician and Pashtun human rights activist
- Hamed Gohar (1907–1992), Egyptian oceanographer and biologist
- Nouran Gohar (born 1997), Egyptian squash player

=== Gauhar ===
- Altaf Gauhar (1923–2000), Pakistani civil servant, journalist, poet, and writer very close to the country's first military dictator, Ayub Khan
- Madeeha Gauhar (1956–2018), Pakistani actress, playwright and director of social theater, and women's rights activist
- Ranjana Gauhar, Indian classical dancer

== See also ==
- Cevahir, Cevher, Dzhokhar, Jauhar, Jawhar, Jawahar, Jawaharlal, al-Jawhari or El-Gohary, Al-Jawhar, Johar, Johari, Johri, Jowhar, Gauhar or Gohar, Gevher, Gevherhan, Govhar, Gowhar, Xhevahir
- Gauahar Khan (born 1983), Indian model and actress
