= Gevherhan Sultan =

Gevherhan Sultan may refer to Ottoman princesses:

- Gevhermüluk Sultan (daughter of Bayezid II) Ottoman princess;
- Gevherhan Sultan (daughter of Selim I) Ottoman princess;
- Gevherhan Sultan (daughter of Selim II) Ottoman princess;
- Gevherhan Sultan (daughter of Ahmed I) Ottoman princess;
- Gevherhan Sultan (daughter of Murad IV) Ottoman princess;
- Gevherhan Sultan (daughter of Ibrahim) Ottoman princess;
- Gevherhan Sultan (daughter of Mehmed IV) Ottoman princess;
- Gevheri Sultan, Ottoman princess

== See also ==
- Cevher, Dzhokhar, Jauhar, Jawhar, Jawahar, Jawaharlal, al-Jawhari or El-Gohary, Johar, Johari, Johri, Jowhar, , Gevherhan, Gauhar or Gohar, Govhar, Gowhar, Xhevahir
- Gevhermelik Hatun (daughter of Cem Sultan) Ottoman princess;
- Gevherşah Hanımsultan (daughter of Ayşe Sultan) Ottoman princess;
