= Johari =

Johari is a given name and a surname. Notable people with thye name include:

== Given name ==
- Johari Johnson, American actress and comedian
- Johari Abdul, Malaysian politician
- Johari Abdul Ghani, Malaysian politician
- Johari Abdul-Malik, American imam
- Johari Amini, American editor
- Johari Ramli (born 1949), Malaysian cyclist

== Surname ==
- Azizi Johari (born 1948), American model and actress
- Ismail Johari, Malaysian writer
- Khairul Helmi Johari (born 1988), Malaysian footballer
- Khir Johari (1923–2006), Malaysian politician
- Mohammed Ali bin Johari (1976–2008), Singaporean convicted murderer who raped and killed his stepdaughter.
- Nurfais Johari (born 1999), Malaysian footballer
- Nurul Farhanah Johari, Malaysian weightlifter
- Ramona Johari (1967–2005), Singaporean murder victim
- Tarmizi Johari, Bruneian footballer
- Zairil Khir Johari (born 1982), Malaysian politician

== See also ==
- Cevahir, Cevher, Dzhokhar, Jauhar, Jawhar, Jawahar, Jawaharlal, al-Jawhari or El-Gohary, Al-Jawhar, Johar, Johari, Johri, Jowhar, Gauhar or Gohar, Gevher, Gevherhan, Govhar, Gowhar, Xhevahir
