= Cevher =

Cevher is a Turkish given name. Notable people with the name include:

- Cevher Özden (1933–2008), Turkish banker
- Cevher Özer (born 1983), Turkish basketball player
- Cevher Toktas (born 1987), Turkish footballer

== See also ==
- Dzhokhar, Jauhar, Jawhar, Jawahar, Jawaharlal, al-Jawhari or El-Gohary, Johar, Johari, Johri, Jowhar, Gauhar or Gohar, Gowhar
