= Jawahar =

- Gender: Masculine
- Language: جواہر (Urdu)

Origin
- Language: Arabic
- Meaning: "Jewel"

Other names
- Derived: Jawaharat

Jawahar is a male given name. It may refer to:

== People ==
- Jawahar Singh
- Jawahar Singh (wazir)
- Jawahar Lal Kaul
- Jawahar Bakshi

== Places ==
- Jawahar Circle
- Jawahar Point, lunar impact location of Chandrayaan-1's Moon Impact Probe
- Jawahar Tunnel

== See also ==
- Cevahir, Cevher, Dzhokhar, Jauhar, Jawhar, Jawahar, Jawaharlal, al-Jawhari or El-Gohary, Al-Jawhar, Johar, Johari, Johri, Jowhar, Gauhar or Gohar, Gevher, Gevherhan, Govhar, Gowhar, Xhevahir
