= Al-Jawhari =

Al-Jawhari (Arabic: الجوهري), also romanized as al-Jauhari, El-Gohary is the nisba or the surname of a person. It may refer to:

== Al-Jawhari ==
- Al-Abbās ibn Said al-Jawharī (died c. 860), Iraqi mathematician who wrote a commentary on Euclid's Elements
- Eliya ibn ʿUbaid, called al-Jawharī (fl. 879–903), Church of the East bishop and writer
- Abu Nasr al-Jawhari (died c. 1003), Turkic lexicographer who wrote one of the first large Arabic dictionaries
- Nur al-Din Ali ibn Da'ud al-Jawhari al-Sayrafi (1416-c. 1495), Egyptian historian and copyist

== El-Gohary ==
- Abdel Nasser El-Gohary
- Ibrahim El-Gohary
- Mahmoud El-Gohary
- Mohamed El-Gohary Hanafy

== See also ==
- Cevher, Dzhokhar, Jauhar, Jawhar, Jawahar, Jawaharlal, al-Jawhari or El-Gohary, Al-Jawhar, Johar, Johari, Johri, Jowhar, Gauhar or Gohar, Gevher, Gevherhan, Govhar, Gowhar, Xhevahir
- Talib Jauhari
