= Naneh Khanum Ostad =

Wife of Fath-Ali Shah Qajar

Hajieh Naneh Khanum Ostad
- ننه‌خانم استاد
- Era: Qajar era
- Spouse: Fath-Ali Shah Qajar
- Children: Tayghun Khanum; Ezzat Nesa Khanum
- Father: Mohammad Mehdi Khan Shihneh Mazandarani Pazvari

Naneh Khanum Ostad (Persian: ننه‌خانم استاد), also known as Hajieh Ostad (حاجیه استاد), was a prominent and influential wife of Fath-Ali Shah Qajar. As the Shah's wife, she held a special place at the Qajar harem. However, it was her administrative abilities and political intelligence that made her one of the most influential women of the royal harem. Naneh Khanum's role at court extended beyond that of a regular wife, as she held important duties and responsibilities that granted her a distinguished position. As a sign of his affection, Fath-Ali Shah Qajar sent Naneh Khanum on a pilgrimage to Mecca, which earned her the title of Hajieh.

Her exact date of birth and death are unknown.

== Biography ==
=== Personal and family life ===
Naneh Khanum was the daughter of Mohammad Mehdi Khan Shihneh Mazandarani Pazvari, the governor (Shihneh) (Note: The man appointed by the king to oversee affairs and manage the governance of the people in the city. Dehkhoda Dictionary.) of Babol and one of the nobles of Fath-Ali Shah's era in Mazandaran. She was also the mother of Tayghun Khanum and the aunt of Reza-Qoli Khan Hedayat, the renowned poet and writer of the Qajar era. Another of her daughters, Ezzat Nesā Khanum, was married to Haji Mirza Aqasi, the prime minister of Mohammad Shah Qajar. This marriage strengthened Naneh Khanum’s familial ties to the political and literary figures of the Qajar court and enhanced her influence.

Due to Naneh Khanum's prestige, her grandson, Allah Qoli Khan Ilkhani, the son of Ezzat Nesā Khanum from her first marriage, was always recognized as one of Fath-Ali Shah's favored grandsons. Among the princes and royal family, he held a special position, and according to Soltan-Ahmad Mirza Azod od-Dowleh, he was treated as if he were a son’s child rather than a daughter's, reflecting the high regard in which Naneh Khanum and her family were held at court.

=== Role in the harem and court duties ===
In addition to her presence in the royal harem as one of Fath-Ali Shah's wives, Naneh Khanum held significant responsibilities. She was appointed as the supervisor of the Shah's private prayer room and the treasury of the royal harem. These duties enabled her to oversee the financial and religious management of the Shah’s harem with great precision. Furthermore, she was in charge of overseeing several of the Shah’s other wives.

One of her other responsibilities was overseeing the eunuchs of the court, who were tasked with keeping the royal halls lit and handling various affairs related to the royal chambers. These responsibilities illustrate Naneh Khanum's influential and important role in the administrative structure of the court.

=== Close relationship with Fath-Ali Shah ===
Naneh Khanum was not only known for her official duties in the Qajar court but also for her close relationship with the Shah, which made her one of the most influential women. Fath-Ali Shah, who had great trust in her, would sometimes engage in gambling with her, and at times, out of affection, would deliberately lose to her. These informal and friendly interactions between Naneh Khanum and the Shah demonstrate the high level of intimacy and trust between them. Naneh Khanum was also one of the few women allowed to sit beside the Shah, a position that signified her exceptional status and influence at the Qajar court.

=== After the death of Fath-Ali Shah ===
After the death of Fath-Ali Shah, unlike many of his other wives, Naneh Khanum did not leave the royal harem and remained in the royal palace. Mohammad Shah Qajar, Fath-Ali Shah's successor, treated Naneh Khanum as his own mother and held her in high esteem. This respect allowed Naneh Khanum to retain the same status and position she had enjoyed during Fath-Ali Shah's reign until the end of her life.

== Sources ==
Dehkhoda, Ali Akbar: Dehkhoda Dictionary (Digital version, https://dehkhoda.ut.ac.ir) based on the 15-volume physical edition published in 1998. Dehkhoda Dictionary Institute and the International Center for Persian Language Studies, University of Tehran, 2020.

Azod od-Dowleh, Soltan-Ahmad Mirza (1997). Tarikh-e Azodi (in Persian). Elm Pub. ISBN 9786005696325.
