= Dzhokhar (name) =

Dzhokhar or Dƶoxar is a Chechen masculine name of Perso-Arabic origin (جوهر) , meaning "jewel". It may also be a Russian transliteration of the names Johar, Jawhar, etc., see below.

- Dzhokhar Dudayev (1944–1996), Chechen politician, 1st President of the Chechen Republic of Ichkeria
- Dzhokhar Tsarnaev (born 1993), convicted perpetrator of the 2013 Boston Marathon bombings

== See also ==
- Cevher, Dzhokhar, Jauhar, Jawhar, Jawahar, Jawaharlal, al-Jawhari or El-Gohary, Al-Jawhar, Johar, Johari, Johri, Jowhar, Gauhar or Gohar, Gevher, Gevherhan, Govhar, Gowhar, Xhevahir
