= Özden =

Özden is a Turkish surname. Notable people with the surname include:

- Cevher Özden (1933–2008), Turkish banker
- Yekta Güngör Özden (born 1932), Turkish judge, and former president of the Constitutional Court of Turkey
- Özden Öngün (born 1978), Turkish football goalkeeper
