= Tayghun Khanum =

Daughter of Fath-Ali Shah Qajar

- Princess
- Born: 1793
- Died: Unknown
- Spouse: Musa Khan Qajar Qovanlu
- Issue: nine children including Gowhar Qajar
- Persian language: (طیقون خانم)طیغون خانم
- Father: Fath-Ali Shah Qajar
- Mother: Naneh Khanum Ostad
- Relatives: Ezzat Nesa Khanum (sister)

Tayghun Khanum (Persian: طیغون‌ خانم, also spelt طیقون‌ خانم; born 1793) was a daughter of Fath-Ali Shah Qajar from his wife, Naneh Khanum Ostad.

== Early life ==
Tayghun Khanum was born in 1793. Her mother, Naneh Khanum Ostad, was among the wives of Fath-Ali Shah Qajar who married him when he was the crown prince, i.e., prior to 1797. Tayghun Khanum was four years old when Agha Mohammad Shah was assassinated, i.e., in June 1797.

== Marriage and family life ==
Tayghun Khanum married Musa Khan Qajar Qovanlu, a son of Mehdi Qoli Khan Qajar who was one of Fath-Ali Shah's cousins. This union further strengthened ties within the Qajar aristocracy. Through this marriage, she bore nine children. While not all of their names are documented, the known children include:Jafar Qoli Khan, Mehdi Qoli Khan, Mohammad Qoli Khan, Soltan Qoli Khan, Musa Khan, and Gowhar Qajar, a renowned poetess with the title Shams al-Shu'ara (شمس الشعراء; lit. Sun of the Poets).

== Later life ==
In later years, Tayghun Khanum traveled to Mecca for pilgrimage. Then, she visited the tomb of some Imams.

== Sources ==
- Azodi, Ahmad Mirza Azdo-Dowleh (1887). تاریخ عضدی [Azodi History] (in Persian). Maharat.
- Khavari, Mirza Fazlollah Shirazi (1845). Tarikh Zol Qarnein (تاریخ ذوالقرنین) (in Persian). Ministry of Culture and Islamic Guidance of Iran.
