= Malik Shaukat Ali =

Pakistani politician

Member of the Provincial Assembly of Khyber Pakhtunkhwa
- In office 13 August 2018 – 18 January 2023
- Succeeded by: Zarshad Khan
- Constituency: PK-48 (Mardan-I)

Personal details
- Party: IPP (2025-present)
- Other political affiliations: PTI-P (2023-2025); PTI (2018-2023)

Malik Shaukat Ali is a Pakistani politician who had been a member of the Provincial Assembly of Khyber Pakhtunkhwa since August 2018 till January 2023.

== Political career ==
He was elected to the Provincial Assembly of Khyber Pakhtunkhwa as a candidate of Pakistan Tehreek-e-Insaf from Constituency PK-48 (Mardan-I) in the 2018 Pakistani general election. and elected Chairman De dak of Distt Mardan. he is koni morata and konatawar politician in Mardan. also Chairman of the standing committee of irrigation Department.
