= Zarshad Khan =

Pakistani politician

Member of the Provincial Assembly of Khyber Pakhtunkhwa
- Incumbent
- Assumed office 29 February 2024
- Preceded by: Malik Shaukat Ali
- Constituency: PK-54 Mardan-I

Personal details
- Born: Mardan District, Khyber Pakhtunkhwa, Pakistan
- Party: PTI (2024-present)

Zarshad Khan is a Pakistani politician from Mardan District. He is currently serving as member of the Provincial Assembly of Khyber Pakhtunkhwa since February 2024.

== Career ==
He contested the 2024 general elections as a Pakistan Tehreek-e-Insaf/Independent candidate from PK-54 Mardan-I. He secured 42,754 votes while the runner-up was Gohar Ali Shah of ANP who secured 17,064 votes.

He is the MPA of PK-54 as well as he become Chairman DDAC (District Development Advisory Committee) of Distt Mardan
