= Jawaharlal =

Jawaharlal is a given name. People with this name include:

- Jawaharlal Darda (1923–1997), Indian independence activist and politician
- Jawaharlal Nehru (1889–1964), Indian independence leader who was the 1st Prime Minister of India from 1947 to 1964
- Jawaharlal Rohatgi (fl. 1960s), Indian politician

== See also ==
- Cevher, Dzhokhar, Jauhar, Jawhar, Jawahar, Jawaharlal, al-Jawhari or El-Gohary, Al-Jawhar, Johar, Johari, Johri, Jowhar, Gauhar or Gohar, Gevher, Gevherhan, Govhar, Gowhar, Xhevahir
