= Xhevahir =

Xhevahir is an Albanian masculine given name. The origin of the name comes from the Turkish word cevahir which itself comes from the Arabic jawahir which means jewel. Notable people with the name include:

- Xhevahir Kapllani (born 1974), Albanian footballer
- Xhevahir Spahiu (born 1945), Albanian poet
- Xhevahir Sukaj (born 1987), Albanian footballer

== See also ==
- Dzhokhar, Jauhar, Jawhar, Jawahar, Jawaharlal, al-Jawhari or El-Gohary, Johar, Johari, Johri, Jowhar, Gauhar or Gohar, Gowhar
