= Erciyes University Radio Observatory =

- Organization: Erciyes University
- Location: Melikgazi, Kayseri Province, Turkey
- Coordinates: 38°42′37″N 35°32′44″E
- Altitude: 1,050 m (3,440 ft)
- Website: Official website

Telescopes
- UZAYBİMER Radyo Teleskop: 12.8 m Radio telescope
- T30: Meade LX200
- T40 Meade: Meade LX200
- Location of Erciyes University Radio Observatory

The Erciyes University Astronomy and Space Science Observatory Applied Research Center (Turkish: Erciyes Üniversitesi Astronomi ve Uzay Bilimleri Gözlemevi Uygulama ve Araştırma Merkezi) (UZAYBİMER) is a radio astronomy observatory operated by the Astronomy and Space Sciences Department at Erciyes University's Faculty of Science. It is located within university's campus at Melikgazi, Kayseri in central Turkey.

Observatory's first radio telescope was a parabolic antenna of 2 m (6.6 ft) diameter, which was donated by the Marmara Research Center (MAM) of Scientific and Technological Research Council of Turkey (TÜBİTAK). The radio telescope, then called MRT-2, was initially purchased from the Institute of Radio Astronomy in Kharkiv, Ukraine with the financial help of UNIDO in 1996. Built to operate in the radio frequency range of 85-115 GHz, it was intended for the acquisition of carbon monoxide data in the Milky Way. In 1997, the telescope became inoperable, and the Ukrainian technicians were unavailable for its reparature. After some unsuccessful attempts to fix the radio telescope at site, it was handed over in 2000 to Erciyes University, where its rehabilitation was carried out between 2001-2002.

The next radio telescopes were two parabolic antennas of 5 m (16 ft) diameter (ERT-5), which were donated from the local branch office of Türk Telekom in 2000. They are part of a project to build an astronomical interferometer. The radio telescopes operate in the frequencies of 4.5, 11 and 20 GHz. In addition, a 3 m (9.8 ft) diameter antenna is situated at the site as well.

Further radio telescopes installed at the observatory are a 12.8 m (42 ft) antenna and a 22 m (72 ft) radome, both donated by NATO SATCOM.

Currently, the observatory operates the 12.8 m (42 ft) single-dish Cassegrain focus radio telescope inside the radome, two optical reflecting telescopes of 30 cm (12 in) and 40 cm (16 in) diameter.
