= Erciyes University =

Public university in Kayseri, Turkey

Coordinates: 38.704602°N 35.52352°E

- Erciyes Üniversitesi
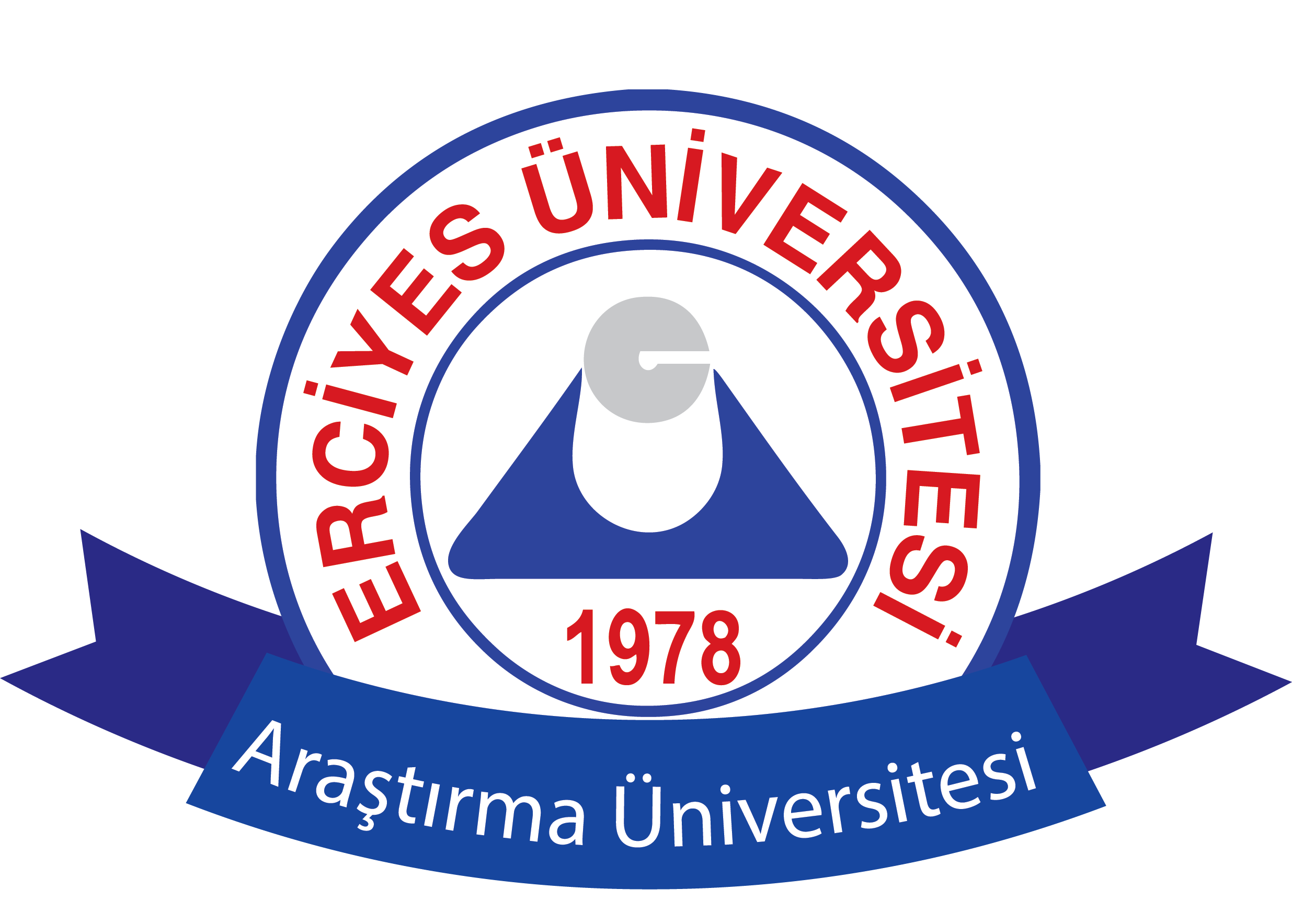
- Motto: Zirvedeki Üniversite (Turkish)
- Motto in English: University at the Summit
- Type: Public research university
- Established: 1978; 48 years ago
- Affiliations: CoHE; EUA; Bologna Process; Erasmus
- Budget: $161 million (2024)
- Rector: Fatih Altun
- Academic staff: 2,089 (2026)
- Undergraduates: 47,460 (2024)
- Postgraduates: 7,378 (2024)
- Location: Talas, Kayseri
- Campus: Suburban
- Language: Turkish, English
- Colors: Blue Gray
- Mascot: Mount Erciyes
- Website: erciyes.edu.tr

Erciyes University (Turkish: Erciyes Üniversitesi), commonly known as ERU, is a public research university in Kayseri, Turkey. It was established in 1978. The Council of Higher Education designated Erciyes University as one of the first ten research universities in Turkey and the only one located outside Istanbul, Ankara, and İzmir.

== History ==
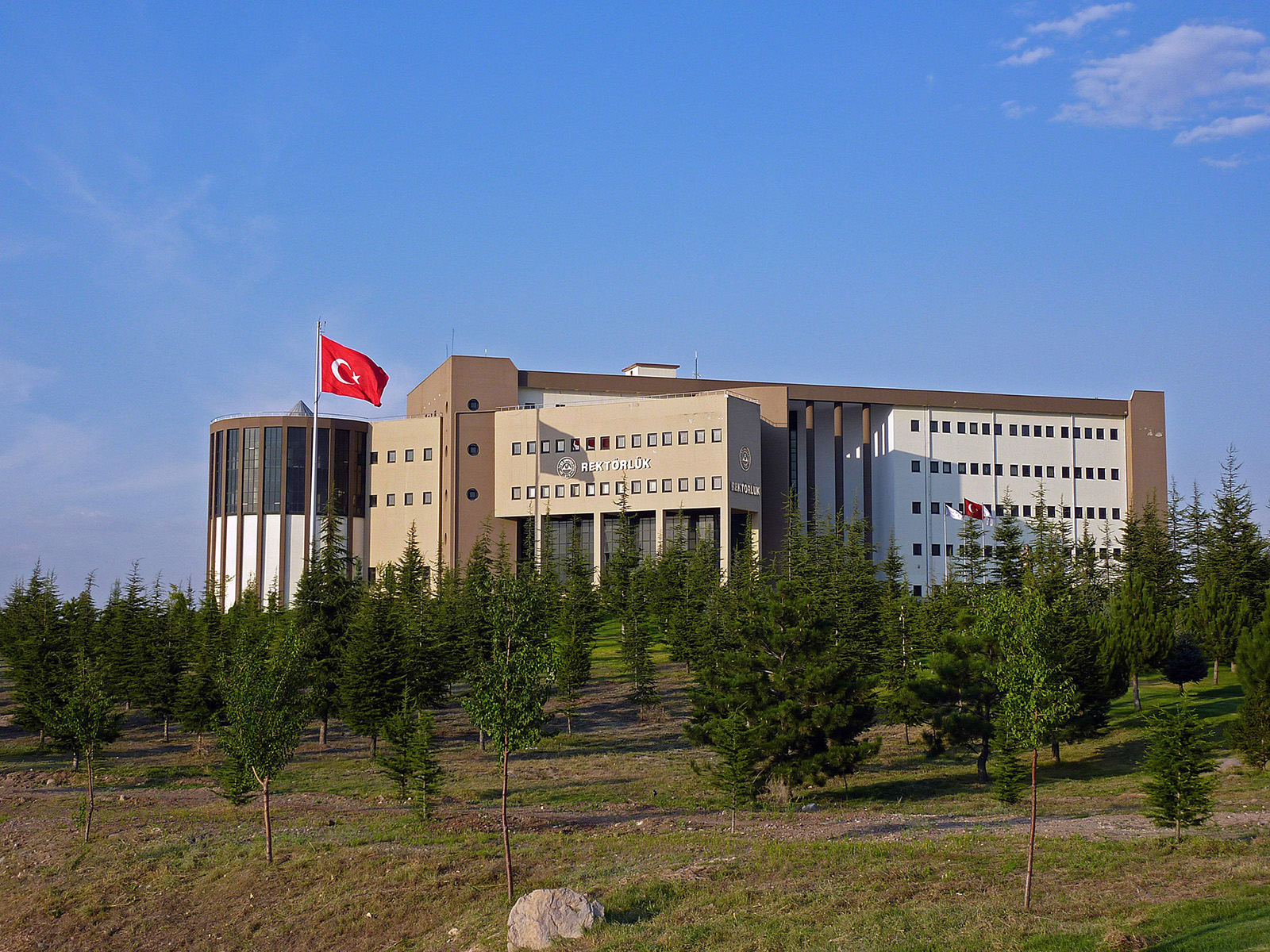
The rectorate building of Erciyes University

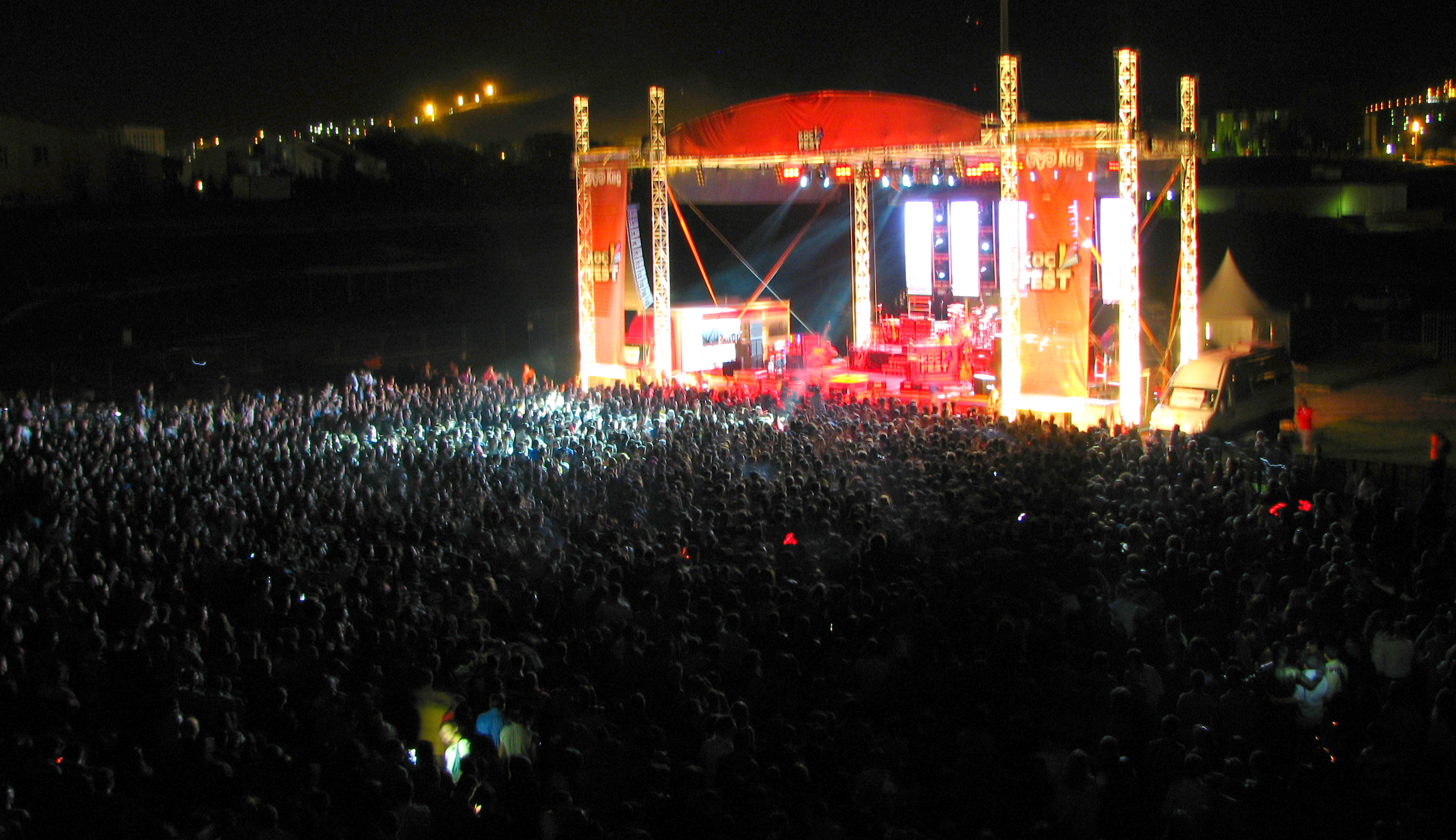
The Spring Festival at Erciyes University is an annual event featuring cultural performances, exhibitions, and live music.

Erciyes University originated from the Gevher Nesibe Medical School, established in 1969 as an affiliate of Hacettepe University, and the Kayseri Business School, founded in 1977. These institutions were merged to form the University of Kayseri in 1978. In 1982, the university incorporated the Faculty of Engineering and the Faculty of Theology, becoming Erciyes University shortly thereafter. The university is named after Mount Erciyes, located approximately 15 kilometres southwest of the campus.

The establishment of Erciyes University was initiated by local leaders, including politicians Turhan Feyzioğlu, Health Minister Vedat Ali Özkan, and Mayor Mehmet Çalık. Their efforts, supported by İhsan Doğramacı, then-Rector of Hacettepe University, led to the creation of the Gevher Nesibe Medical School in Kayseri in 1969, operating as an affiliate of Hacettepe University. In 1975, the faculty relocated to the external clinic of Kayseri Public Hospital.

In 1993, the "Great Kayseri Meeting" was held on Mount Erciyes to promote collaboration between Erciyes University and the local business community. A follow-up event, the "Second Great Kayseri Meeting," took place in 1995, furthering local engagement with the university’s development. During this period, several construction projects were supported by local philanthropists, and President Süleyman Demirel attended related ceremonies, providing official recognition of the initiatives.

In 2017, Erciyes University was designated by the Council of Higher Education as one of the first ten institutions in Turkey to receive the status of a research university. It was the only university outside Istanbul, Ankara, and İzmir included in this group.

The International Advisory Board of Erciyes University consists of academics from various international institutions. Among the members are Professor Tanju Karanfil from Clemson University, Professor Yaşar Onel from the University of Iowa, and Professor İbrahim Tarık Özbolat from Penn State University. Other members include Professor Michael Wurm from University of Mainz, Professor Robert Svoboda from the University of California-Davis, and Professor John A. Rogers from Northwestern University. Additionally, Professor Xian Huang from Tianjin University, Professor Olcay Y. Jones from Walter Reed National Military Medical Center, Assoc. Professor Deniz Peker from Emory University, Professor Tamer Kahveci from The University of Florida, and Professor Weihong Tan from Hunan University are also part of the advisory board.

=== Location ===
Erciyes University is located in Kayseri, a city with a population of approximately 1.39 million. The main campus lies about 6 kilometers from the city center and roughly 25 kilometers from Erciyes Ski Resort. The university is also situated around 80 kilometers from Cappadocia, a UNESCO World Heritage Site.

== Industrial contribution ==
Erciyes Technology Development Zone (Turkish: Erciyes Teknopark) was officially designated as a Technology Development Zone in the Official Gazette on 30 April 2004, covering an area of 250,549.80 square meters. The management company, Erciyes Teknopark A.Ş., was founded on 8 February 2005 to administer the zone. The area operates under Turkey’s Law on Technology Development Zones (Law No. 4691).

In 2018, the total R&D revenue at Erciyes Teknopark reached 500 million Turkish lira. In the same year, ETTOTronic, Kayseri’s first electronics cluster, was established with government support.

== Research ==
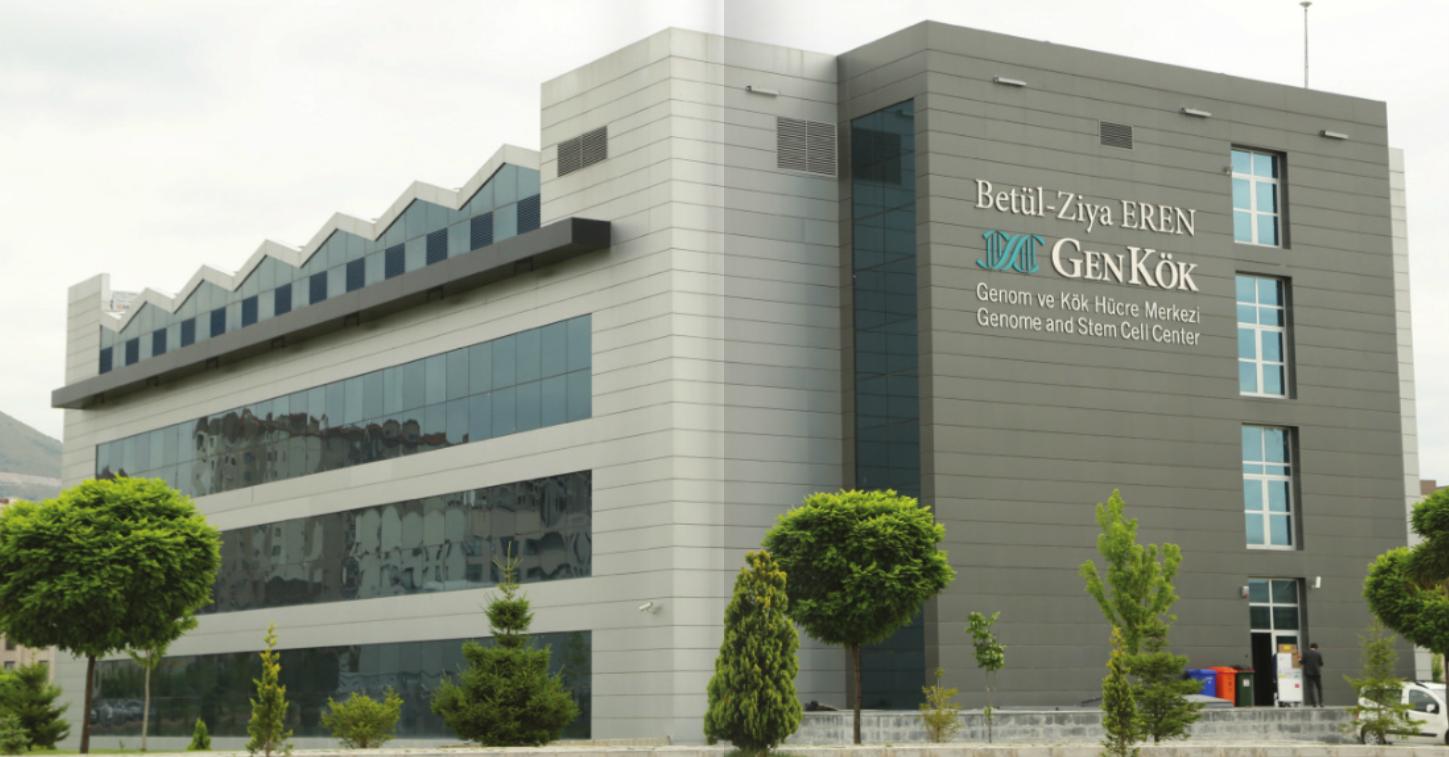
The side view of the Genome and Stem Cell Center at Erciyes University

Erciyes University, designated as one of the ten research universities in Turkey, supports research activities through both internal and external funding mechanisms. External sources include programs such as those of the European Research Council and the Scientific and Technological Research Council of Turkey, while internal funding is provided by the Scientific Research Projects (BAP) office. In 2023, BAP funded 530 projects with a total budget of approximately 127 million Turkish lira.

The Erciyes Neutrino Research Group (ENRG) participates in international neutrino experiments, including the ANNIE and NOvA experiments at the Fermi National Accelerator Laboratory in the United States. The group contributes to physics analysis and neutron simulation studies for these experiments. ENRG also operates a detector research and development program for neutrino experiments, focusing on the development of particle detectors and calorimeters. One member holds an affiliated scientist position at the University of Iowa and is involved with the CMS experiment at CERN, part of the Large Hadron Collider.

== International partnerships and rankings ==
University rankings

Global – Overall
- THE World: 1201-1500 (2025)

Global – Life sciences and medicine
- THE Clinical and Health: 801-1000 (2025)
- THE Life Sciences: 801-1000 (2025)

Global – Science and engineering
- THE Engineering: 801-1000 (2025)
- THE Physical Sciences: 601-800 (2025)

Regional – Overall
- QS Emerging Europe and Central Asia: 155 (2022)
- QS Europe: 511-520 (2024)
- USNWR Asia: 452 (2024)

National – Science and engineering
- USNWR Engineering: 9 (2024)

Erciyes University has established international partnerships through bilateral agreements and participation in the Erasmus Programme. In Germany, Erciyes University partners with University of Cologne, Hochschule Niederrhein, and RWTH Aachen University. In Spain, the university has agreements with the University of Salamanca and the University of Castilla-La Mancha. In Portugal, it collaborates with the University of Coimbra, Polytechnic Institute of Coimbra, and Polytechnic Institute of Leiria. In Italy, including the University of Modena and Reggio Emilia, Marche Polytechnic University, the University of Siena, and the University of Perugia. In Poland, it collaborates with the Military University of Technology in Warsaw.

Erciyes University also collaborates with institutions in Greece, including the University of Ioannina and the University of Thessaly. Other partnerships include Széchenyi István University in Hungary, the University of Nantes in France, and the American University in Bulgaria. The university maintains a cooperation agreement with the Giuseppe Martucci Conservatory of Music in Salerno, Italy, focusing on music education.

The Journal of Clinical Practice and Research, affiliated with Erciyes University School of Medicine, is an international open-access journal that publishes six issues per year. Its advisory board includes members from institutions such as the University of Texas Southwestern Medical Center, New York University Langone Medical Center, Yale University, Chinese University of Hong Kong, Massachusetts General Hospital, Dammam University King Fahd Hospital, University of Alabama at Birmingham, Albert Einstein College of Medicine, University of Central Florida College of Medicine, and Johns Hopkins University.

The Adult Bone Marrow Transplantation Center at Erciyes University is accredited by JACIE, the European accreditation body for haematopoietic cell transplantation and cellular therapy. The Children's Bone Marrow Transplantation Center is the first facility in Turkey to receive JACIE certification. The Children's Hematology-Oncology and Bone Marrow Transplantation Hospital is the largest pediatric bone marrow transplantation facility in Turkey. The Erciyes University Drug Research Center collaborates with international regulatory bodies, including the European Medicines Agency (EMA) and the Food and Drug Administration (FDA).

Erciyes University’s Faculty of Economics and Administrative Sciences began the accreditation process with Agentur für Qualitätssicherung durch Akkreditierung von Studiengängen E.V. (AQAS). The university’s Business, Economics, and Finance programs completed the process and received recognition from AQAS. The School of Veterinary Medicine holds accreditation from the European Association of Establishments for Veterinary Education (EAEVE). The Hebrew Language and Culture Program is the only undergraduate program of its kind in Turkey. In 2021, Erciyes University was ranked among the top 100 universities globally by UI GreenMetric for environmental sustainability.

== See also ==
- Erciyes University Radio Observatory
