= Sabria Jawhar =

Saudi Arabian journalist and columnist

Sabria S. Jawhar
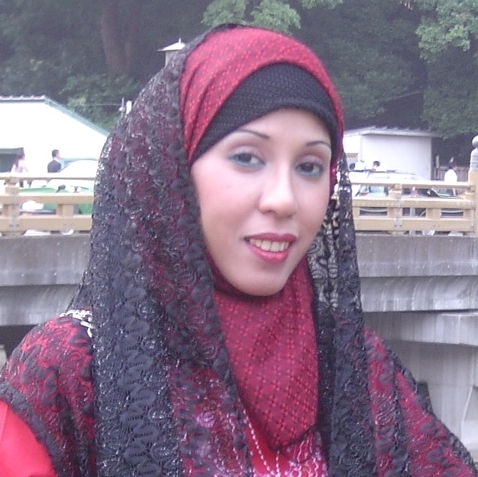
- Jawhar in 2009
- Born: 4 August; Madinah, Saudi Arabia
- Occupations: Journalist, academic
- Website: saudiwriter.blogspot.com

Sabria Salama Murjan Jawhar (born 4 August, year unknown) is a Saudi Arabian journalist and columnist for the Jeddah-based Arab News. She has an expertise in Arabic/English linguistics. She also writes for English-language news outlets, including The Huffington Post, and serves as an assistant professor in the field of applied linguistics. In 2010, Jawhar was named by the Dubai-based Arabian Business magazine as one of the "World's Most Influential Arabs" by ranking her No. 94 in its "Power 100" list. The magazine also listed her in 2011 as one of the "100 Most Powerful Arab Women".

== Personal life ==
Jawhar was born in Madinah to Salama Jawhar and Alia Muhmmad Al-Atayyah. She is the seventh of 11 children with six brothers and four sisters. Her father retired after 40 years in the Ministry of the Interior in the prisons sector and established a furniture-making business. Her brother Asaad Jawhar is a petroleum economics analyst and lecturer at King Abdul Aziz University.

== Education and early career ==
Following her graduation from high school she attended King Abdul Aziz University in Madinah where she earned a bachelor of arts degree in English language and literature. She earned her master's degree in Applied Linguistics at Umm Al-Qura University in Makkah.

Jawhar worked briefly as an English language teacher at Al-Wastah High School in Madinah, before assuming duties as an English language teacher and language lab supervisor at Al-Abrar Private High School. In 2003, she taught English language conversation courses at Al-Sebai Medical Training Institute in Madinah. In 2006, she served as a lecturer at King Saud bin Abdulaziz University for Health Sciences, Nursing College, in Jeddah. In 2009, she became an associate fellow in the British Academy of Higher Education. She also served as a lecturer for the Saudi Ministry of Education.

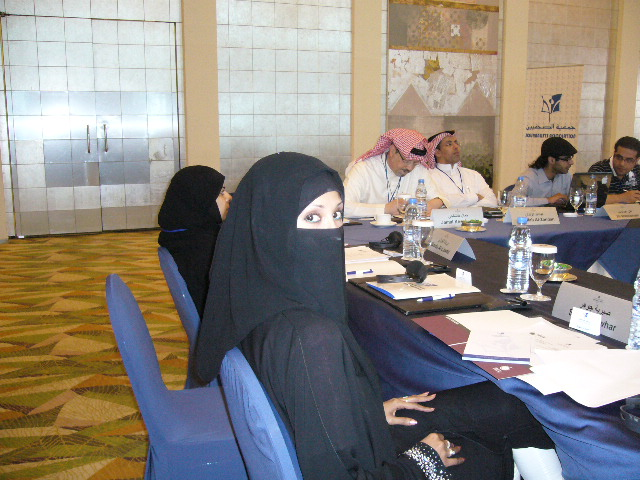
Jawhar was a panelist at the U.S. State Department-sponsored International Research and Exchanges (IREX) board conference for Middle East bloggers in Dubai in 2009.

== Journalism career ==
In 2003–2004, Jawhar turned to journalism, taking intensive courses from the Beirut, Lebanon-based Al-Naha Institute and the Professionals Institute in Jeddah, Saudi Arabia.

She joined the Saudi Gazette, an English-language general circulation tabloid owned by the Arabic newspaper company Okaz Organization, after an extensive journalism training program. Initially assigned as supervisor to the Ladies’ Department, she was promoted as the newspaper's first female Jeddah bureau chief.

At the Saudi Gazette she covered from Jeddah the terrorist attacks in Yanbu, Riyadh, Al-Khobar, Jeddah and Al-Ras between 2003 and 2006. Jawhar also focused on women's rights, health, politics and economic issues, including directing coverage of the annual Jeddah Economic Forum.

By 2004, she was writing a weekly column that focused primarily on Saudi domestic issues and Saudi Arabia's relationship with the international community. Her column has since expanded to such news outlets as the Huffington Post and Arabisto.com, and has evolved to addressing Western audiences rather than Saudi readers. Her columns are archived on her blog, Sabria's Out of the Box.

In 2011, Jawhar put her career as a journalist on hiatus in order to complete her post-graduate studies at the University of Newcastle Upon Tyne in Newcastle, England. She earned her doctorate in April 2012 in educational applied linguistics and resumed teaching at King Saud bin Abdulaziz University for Health Sciences. In 2012, she became a columnist for the Arab News, focusing primarily on women's rights and government issues.

== Politics ==
Jawhar considers herself politically moderate, although some Saudi journalists say her views of Saudi society should be categorized more as liberal given the conservative nature of most Saudis. She is equally critical of Islamic and Western extremists and condemns all forms of terrorism. She rejects the label of Islamic Wahhabism applied to Saudis as a Western invention. Jawhar is a strong believer in the hijab as a religious obligation, but defends a woman's right to choose whether to wear one. Similarly, she personally opposes wearing the burqa, or abaya, in non-Muslim countries but asserts it's a woman's choice. Only in Saudi Arabia does she choose to wear the niqab to honor her cultural background.

Her writing on women's rights include their right to drive an automobile in Saudi Arabia. She also argues for Saudi authorities to loosen male guardianship restrictions on women, but her position on women's rights is framed within the context of Islam. She strongly opposes revisions of the Qur’an. But she believes some aspects of Islam are flexible and are subject to modification based on changes in society. She also has written that dress codes, driving and some aspects of male guardianship have been left open to interpretation or not addressed in the Qur’an and should be revisited by Islamic scholars.
