= Allah-Qoli Khan Ilkhani =

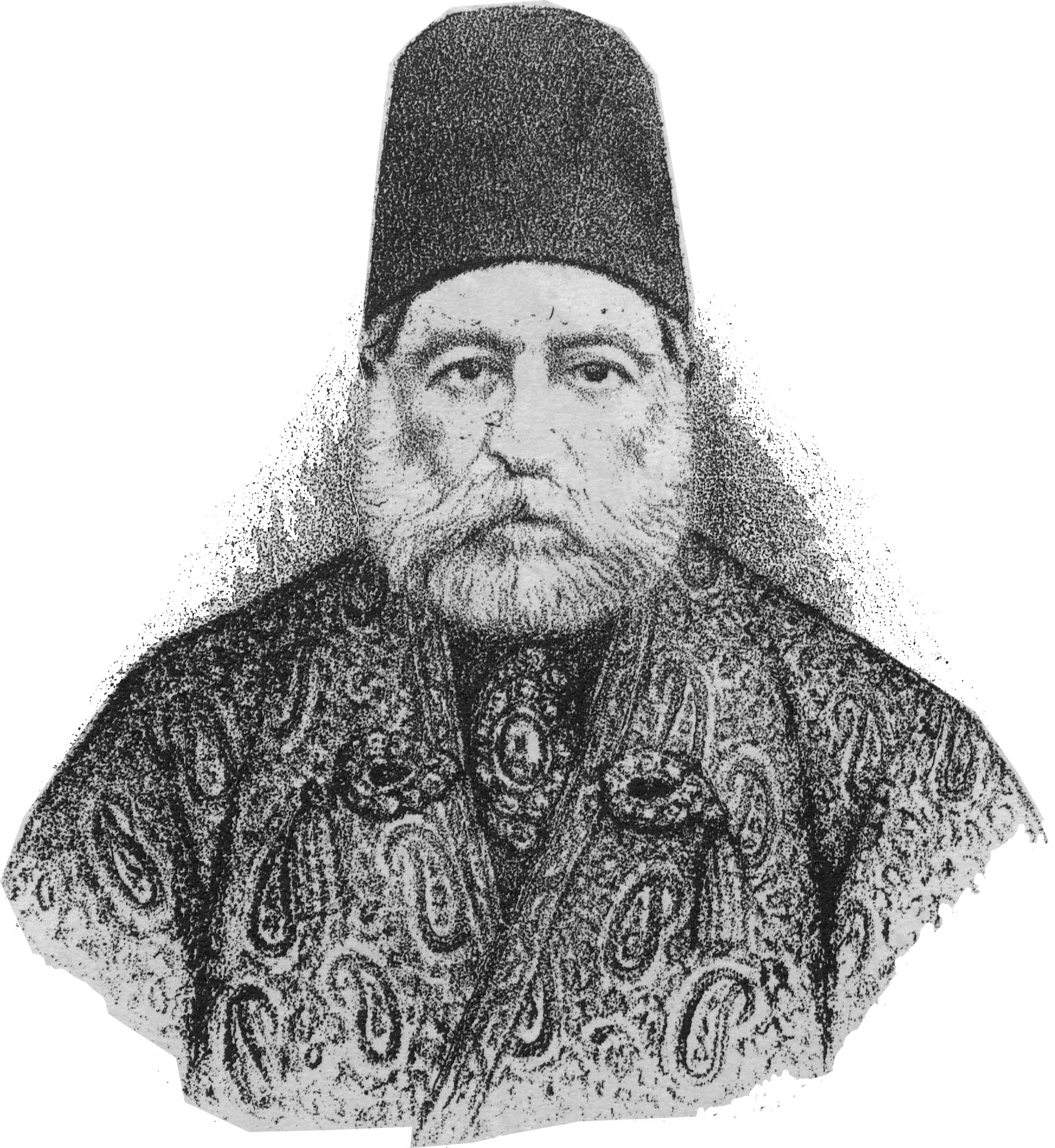
Illustration of Allah-Qoli Khan Ilkhani by Abu Torab Ghaffari, dated 1884

Allah-Qoli Khan Ilkhani (Persian: الله‌قلی‌خان ایلخانی; 1820 – March 1892) was a Qajar prince, politician and governor in 19th-century Iran. He was both the fraternal nephew and grandson of Fath-Ali Shah Qajar (r. 1797–1834), his mother being the latters daughter Ezzat Nesā Khanum.

== Sources ==
- Amanat, Abbas (1985). "Allāh-qolī Khan Īlḵānī". In Yarshater, Ehsan (ed.). Encyclopædia Iranica. Vol. I/8: Alafrank–Alp Arslan. London and New York: Routledge & Kegan Paul. pp. 888–889. ISBN 978-0-71009-097-3.
