= Cevher Toktaş =

Turkish footballer (born 1987)

Personal information
- Full name: Cevher Toktaş
- Date of birth: 13 September 1987 (age 39)
- Place of birth: Malatya, Turkey
- Height: 1.90 m (6 ft 3 in)
- Position: Centre-back

Youth career
- 2000: Bursaspor
- 2000–2003: Hürriyetspor
- 2003–2004: Orhangazispor
- 2004–2005: Bursa Yolspor
- 2005–2006: Orhangazispor

Senior career*
Years	Team	Apps	(Gls)
2006–2007	Orhangazispor	0	(0)
2007	→ Bursa Merinosspor (loan)	11	(0)
2007–2010	Hacettepe (Note: Originally called Gençlerbirliği OFTAŞ)	8	(0)
2009	→ Kahramanmaraşspor (loan)	5	(0)
2010	→ Tarsus İdman Yurdu (loan)	9	(0)
2010–2011	Siirtspor	24	(0)
2011–2012	Adıyamanspor	23	(0)
2012–2014	Tarsus İdman Yurdu	38	(1)
2014–2016	Karacabey Belediyespor (Note: Originally called Bursa Nilüferspor)	58	(1)
2016–2018	Kozanspor	36	(1)
2018–2019	Çankaya FK	38	(1)
2019–2020	Bursa Yıldırımspor	17	(2)
Total		267	(6)
- * Club domestic league appearances and goals

Cevher Toktaş (born 13 September 1987) is a Turkish footballer who last played as a centre-back for Bursa Yıldırımspor in the Turkish Regional Amateur League. In May 2020, Toktaş admitted to murdering his five-year-old son by suffocating him with a pillow while in the hospital.

== Career ==
Toktaş made his professional debut for Gençlerbirliği OFTAŞ in the Süper Lig on 2 March 2008, coming on as a substitute in the 89th minute for Serkan Atak in the away match against Çaykur Rizespor, which finished as a 0–0 draw. In total, he made seven appearances for Gençlerbirliği OFTAŞ/Hacettepe in the Süper Lig.

== Murder of son ==
On 23 April 2020, Toktaş's son Kasım, aged five, was brought to Dortcelik Children's Hospital in Bursa with a high fever, breathing difficulties, and coughing. This was thought to be caused by COVID-19. Later that day, Kasım died while in the ICU, which was believed to have been caused by the disease. However, Toktaş went to the police eleven days later on 4 May to confess he had murdered his son while alone in the hospital room. Toktaş admitted to suffocating his son with a pillow over the head for fifteen minutes until he died, before calling a doctor into the room. Toktaş, who said he did not disclose the crime with his family, was subsequently arrested while awaiting trial. In the police report, he stated that he had never loved his son, but that he had no mental issues. He later confessed after feeling remorse. In 2022, Toktaş received an aggravated life sentence.
