= K. L. Johar =

Indian academic

VC Guru Jambheshwar University of Science and Technology
- In office 21/10/1995–20/10/1998

Personal details
- Born: 10/10/1936
- Spouse: Sneh Johar
- Occupation: Professor, Vice-Chancellor
- Profession: Teaching, Administration

Dr. K.L. Johar is the founding Vice-Chancellor of Guru Jambheshwar University of Science and Technology, Hisar. Before that, he was the pro-Vice Chancellor at Kurukshetra University. He is on the planning board of Guru Jambheshwar University of Science and Technology.
