= Ezzat Nesa Khanum =

Daughter of Fath-Ali Shah Qajar

Ezzat Nesā Khanum عزت‌نساء خانم
- Hajieh Princess
- Spouse: Musa Khan (until his death); Haji Mirza Aqasi (until his death)
- Issue: 3, including Allah-Qoli Khan Ilkhani
- Dynasty: Qajar
- Father: Fath-Ali Shah Qajar
- Mother: Naneh Khanum Ostad

Ezzat Nesā Khanum (Note: عزت‌نساء خانم) (also known as Ezzat al-Nesā Khanum) (Note: عزت‌النساء خانم) was a princess of the Qajar dynasty, daughter of Fath-Ali Shah Qajar and his wife Naneh Khanum Ostad. While her exact birth and death dates are not recorded, she played an influential role within the royal court due to her familial connections and close ties with kings and high-ranking statesmen.

== Biography ==
=== Early life and family ===
Ezzat Nesā Khanum was born into a family of considerable social and political standing. Her mother, Naneh Khanum Ostad, was a powerful figure in the shah's harem, exerting influence far beyond the typical role of a royal consort. In addition to her maternal role, Naneh Khanum Ostad held significant responsibilities within the court's inner circles, granting her a unique status within the Qajar power structure. This prestigious position allowed her to create a distinct upbringing for Ezzat Nesā Khanum and her siblings.

=== Marriage to Musa Khan and children ===
Ezzat Nesā Khanum's first marriage was to Musa Khan, a nephew of Fath-Ali Shah. Politically and socially significant, this union aligned her with an influential member of the Qajar family. From this marriage, she had a son named Allah-Qoli Khan Ilkhani, who was ceremonially titled as the Ilkhan of the Qajar tribe. Allah-Qoli Khan was not a well-regarded prince during his lifetime and was known for abuses of power and moral corruption. However, due to the influence and prestige of his grandmother, Naneh Khanum, his stepfather, Mirza Aqasi, and his impact within the Qajar tribe, he was considered a powerful figure.

In addition to Allah-Qoli Khan, Ezzat Nesā Khanum had two daughters from her first marriage, although their names are not mentioned in historical sources. This fact is noted in Tārikh-e Azodi, indicating the importance of this marriage within the family's historical context.

==== Pilgrimage to Mecca and title of Hajieh ====
After the death of Musa Khan, Ezzat Nesā Khanum was sent on a pilgrimage to Mecca. Following this journey, she was referred to as Hajieh Princess Ezzat Nesā Khanum, a title that enhanced her social status among the Qajar family and the broader court circles.

=== Marriage to Haji Mirza Aqasi ===
Ezzat Nesā Khanum's second marriage was to Haji Mirza Aqasi, the powerful grand vizier of Mohammad Shah Qajar. Haji Mirza Aqasi was one of the most influential political figures in Iran during the Qajar era. This marriage had the approval and support of Mohammad Shah, who had a profound respect for both Ezzat Nesā Khanum as his aunt, as well as for Aqasi, who had been his mentor since childhood and remained a trusted advisor. Despite this close relationship, Ezzat Nesā Khanum had no children from this marriage.

=== Personal traits and physical strength ===
Soltan-Ahmad Mirza Azod od-Dowleh, a historian and member of the Qajar family, recounts fascinating stories about Ezzat Nesā Khanum's physical strength. He notes that she was renowned for her strength and skill in wrestling and armwrestling that she frequently competed in wrestling matches with her brothers in the presence of Fath-Ali Shah, often emerging victorious.

Azod od-Dowleh also quotes others who reported that Ezzat Nesā Khanum once made a wager with her brother, Solayman Mirza Qajar, known for his physical prowess, and was able to tear a silver tray in half, as if it were paper. Her exceptional strength and physical abilities made her a distinctive figure among Qajar women.

== Indirect role in politics and influence ==
Although Ezzat Nesā Khanum did not engage directly in politics, her position as the mother of the Ilkhan and wife of the grand vizier placed her at the center of power dynamics. As the mother of Allah-Qoli Khan Ilkhani, and the wife of Haji Mirza Aqasi, she played an essential role in balancing power between the royal court and influential Qajar tribes. During the ongoing struggles over Fath-Ali Shah’s succession, she maintained relationships that preserved and strengthened her family’s influence.
