= Nurul Farhanah Johari =

Malaysian weightlifter

Personal information
- Full name: Nurul Farhanah Binti Johari
- Born: 6 August 1988 (age 37)
- Weight: 68.97 kg (152.1 lb)

Sport
- Country: Malaysia
- Sport: Weightlifting
- Weight class: 69 kg
- Team: National team
- Updated on 8 November 2016

Nurul Farhanah Binti Johari (born 6 August 1988) is a Malaysian female former weightlifter, who competed in the 69 kg category and represented Malaysia at international competitions. She competed at the 2009 Southeast Asian Games.

== Major results ==
Year	Venue	Weight	Snatch (kg)				Clean & Jerk (kg)				Total	Rank
Year	Venue	Weight	1	2	3	Rank	1	2	3	Rank	Total	Rank
Southeast Asian Games
2009	Taldykorgan, Kazakhstan	69 kg	?	?	?	---	?	?	?	---	177	4
Asian Weightlifting Championships
2008		63 kg	85	~~90~~	~~90~~	8	101	106	~~110~~	7	191	7
2009		63 kg	?	?	?	---	?	?	?	---	200	9
