= Mustafa Cevahir =

Turkish football player

Personal information
- Full name: Mustafa Cevahir
- Date of birth: 5 January 1986 (age 40)
- Place of birth: Trabzon, Turkey
- Positions: Central midfielder; right midfielder

Team information
- Current team: Turgutluspor
- Number: 5

Youth career
- 2001–2005: Fenerbahçe

Senior career*
| Years | Team | Apps | (Gls) |
| 2001–2005 | Fenerbahçe A2 | 43 | (2) |
| 2005–2008 | Fenerbahçe | 0 | (0) |
| 2006–2007 | → İstanbulspor (loan) | 19 | (3) |
| 2007–2008 | → Karşıyaka (loan) | 34 | (1) |
| 2008–2009 | Gaziantepspor | 1 | (0) |
| 2009 | Boluspor | 16 | (0) |
| 2009–2010 | Hacettepe | 27 | (1) |
| 2010–2011 | Körfez İskenderunspor | 19 | (0) |
| 2011–2012 | Altay | 28 | (4) |
| 2012–2013 | Yeni Malatyaspor | 23 | (1) |
| 2013–2014 | Altay | 25 | (2) |
| 2014–2015 | Turgutluspor | 28 | (3) |
| 2015–2016 | Sakaryaspor | 23 | (4) |

International career
| 2003—? | Turkey U21 | 33 | (3) |
- * Club domestic league appearances and goals

Mustafa Cevahir (born 5 January 1986 in Trabzon, Turkey) is a Turkish football player who last played for Sakaryaspor. He has played a variety of positions for the Fenerbahçe PAF since 2001.

He played 43 times for Fenerbahçe PAF and scored two goals.
