= Veena Talwar Oldenburg =

American historian

Veena Talwar Oldenburg is Professor of History at Baruch College and The Graduate Center of the City University of New York. She is best known for her widely reviewed book on Dowry murder.

Oldenburg is a native of Lucknow, India and subsequently lived in Gurgaon, India. She has a bachelor's degree from Loreto Convent College and an M.A. from the University of Lucknow. She has a second master's from the University of Bridgeport which she earned shortly after immigrating to the United States in 1970 and a Ph.D. from the University of Illinois at Urbana-Champaign.

Oldenburg has previously taught at Sarah Lawrence College and Columbia University. She is a 2016 Fulbright Nehru Senior Scholar.

== Works ==
She has authored a number of books on Indian history:

- The Making of Colonial Lucknow, 1856-1877 Princeton, New Jersey : Princeton University Press, ©1984.
- Dowry murder : the imperial origins of a cultural crime : Oxford; New York : Oxford University Press, 2002.
  - Review, The American historical review. 112, no. 2, (2007): page 484
  - Review, International Journal of Hindu Studies, 10, no. 1 (2006): pages 117-118
  - Review, Estudios de Asia y Africa. 40, no. 3, (2005): 709
  - Review, The Indian economic and social history review. 41, no. 4, (2004): page 516
- Lifestyle as resistance: the case of the courtesans of Lucknow. \
- Gurgaon: From Mythic Village to Millennium City. New York: Harper Collins, 2018.
