= Ranjana Gauhar =

Indian dancer

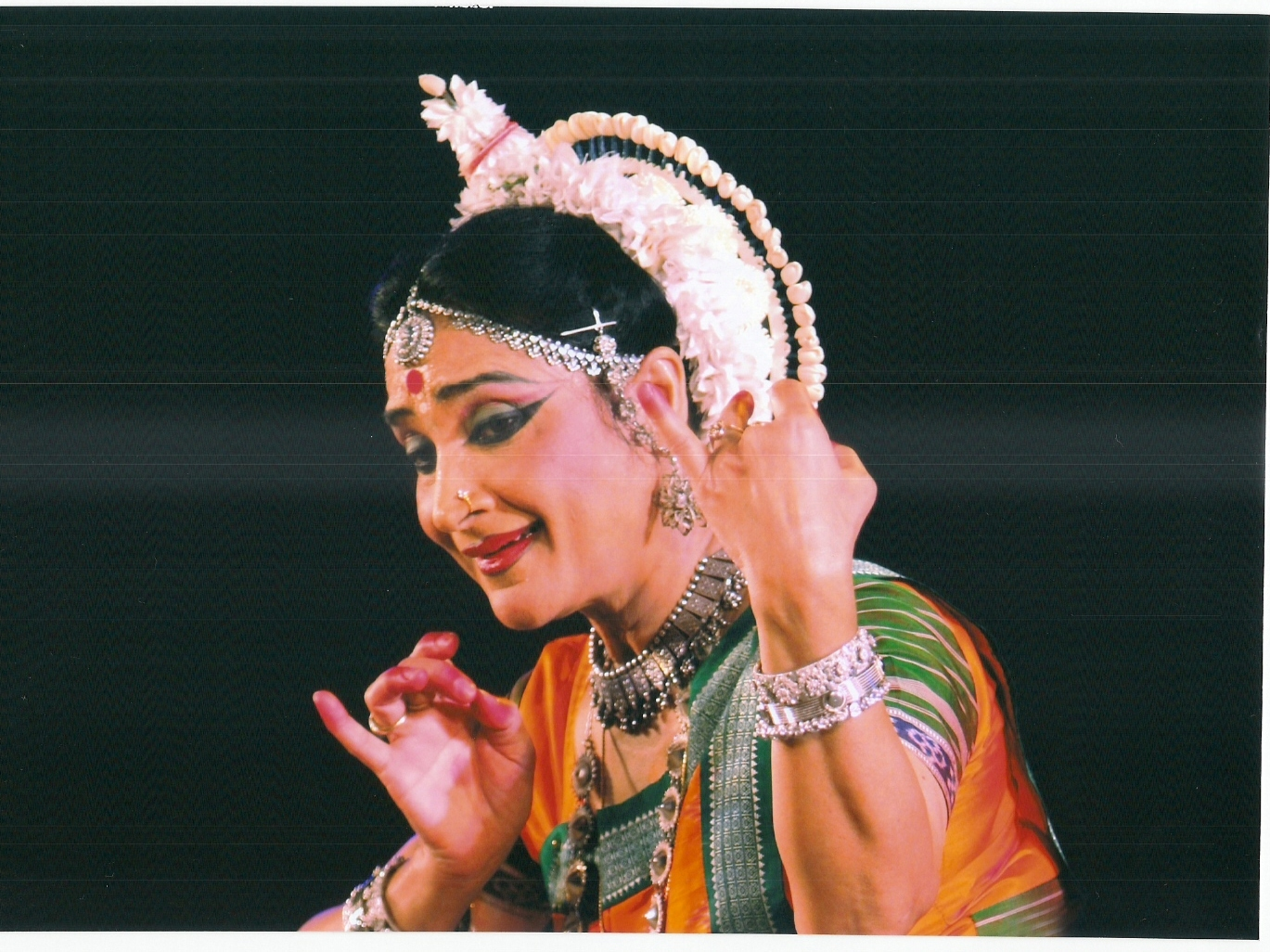
Ranjana Gauhar is an exponent of the Indian Classical dance - Odissi, an ancient dance style which originated, centuries ago, in the temples of Orissa.

Padmashree Ranjana Gauhar is an Odissi dancer.

She won the Padma Shree in 2003 and with the Sangeet Natak Akademi Award for the year 2007 by the President of India.

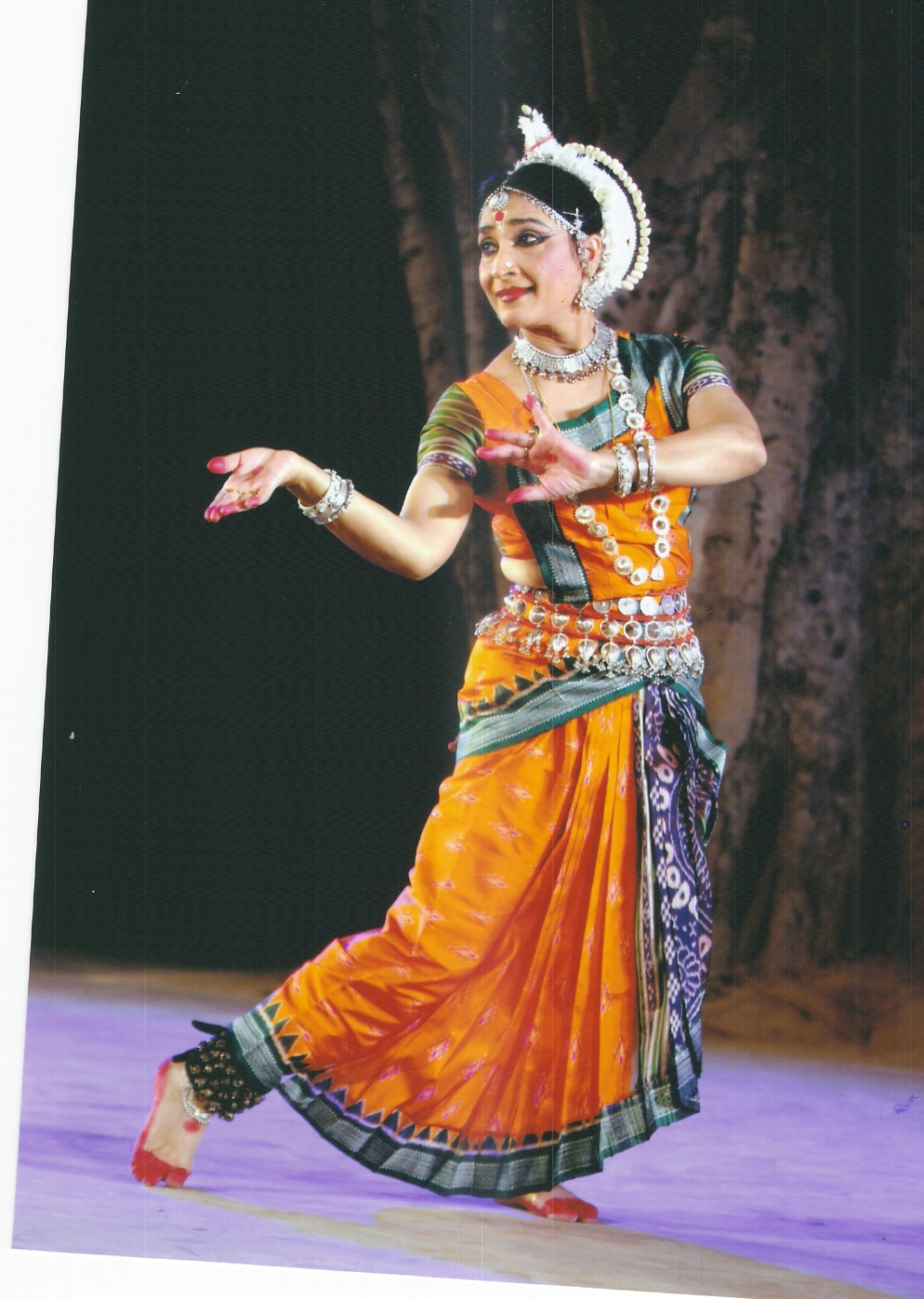
Ranjana Gauhar is an exponent of the Indian Classical dance - Odissi, an ancient dance style which originated, centuries ago, in the temples of Orissa.
