= Gohar Ali Shah =

Pakistani politician

MPA Gohar Ali Shah

Member of the Khyber Pakhtunkhwa Assembly
- In office 2013–2018
- Constituency: PK-28 (Mardan-VI)

Personal details
- Party: Awami National Party
- Occupation: Politician

Gohar Ali Shah is a Pakistani politician hailing from Mardan District, who served as a member of the Khyber Pakhtunkhwa Assembly, belonging to the Awami National Party. He is also serving as member of the different committees.

== Political career ==
Gohar was elected as the member of the Khyber Pakhtunkhwa Assembly on ticket of Awami National Party from PK-28 (Mardan-VI) in the 2013 Pakistani general election.
