= PK-54 Mardan-I =

Pakistani electoral district

- Constituency for the Khyber Pakhtunkhwa Assembly
- Region: Katlang Tehsil (partly) of Mardan District

Current constituency
- Party: Pakistan Tehreek-e-Insaf
- Member(s): Zarshad Khan
- Created from: PK-28 Mardan-VI (2002-2018); PK-48 Mardan-I (2018-2023)

PK-54 Mardan-I (پی کے-54 مردان-1) is a constituency for the Khyber Pakhtunkhwa Assembly of the Khyber Pakhtunkhwa province of Pakistan.

== See also ==
- PK-53 Swabi-V
- PK-55 Mardan-II
