= Gowhar Qajar =

Iranian female poet and astronomer (died c. 1901)

- گوهر قاجار
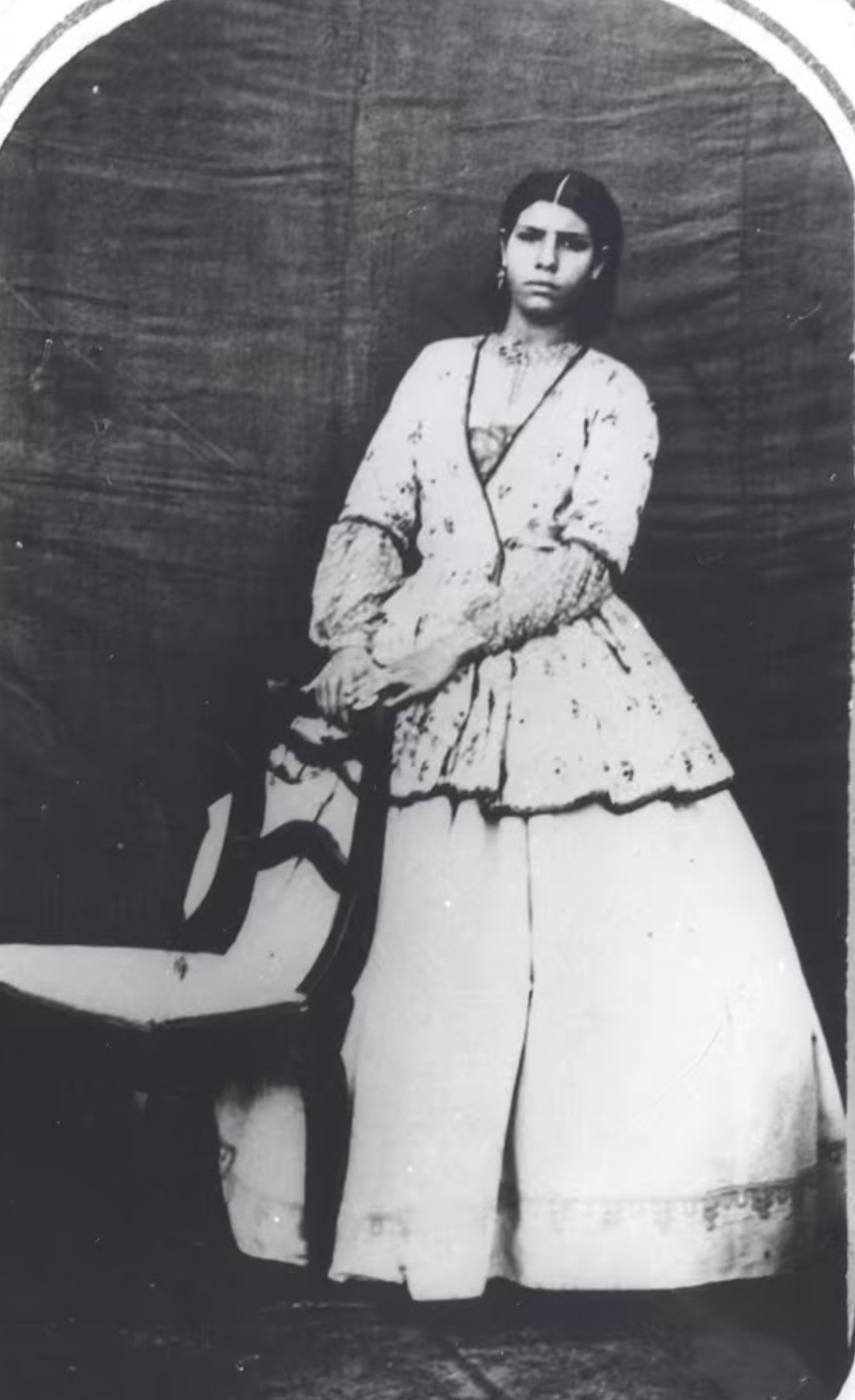
- Gowhar Qajar in crinoline, c.1860
- Died: c. 1901
- Notable work: Gowhariyeh
- Title: Shams al-Shu'ara
- Parent(s): Tayghun Khanum (mother); Musa Khan Qavanlu (father)
- Family: Qajar

Gowhar Qajar (Persian: گوهر قاجار; died c. 1901), also known as Hajieh Gowhar (حاجیه گوهر), was an astronomer, writer, poet, and calligrapher of the Qajar era. She was known by the title Shams al-Shu'ara (شمس‌الشعراء; lit. Sun of the Poets). She is recognized as one of the first female astronomers in Iran and the author of the book Gowhariyeh.

== Biography ==
Gowhar lived in Isfahan during the reigns of Mohammad Shah and Naser al-Din Shah and was knowledgeable in various sciences, including astronomy. Her mother was Tayghun Khanum, a daughter of Fath-Ali Shah Qajar, and her father was Musa Khan Qavanlu. Gowhar was bold and skilled in poetry, especially in composing odes, which was a remarkable feat in that male-dominated era. She honed her poetic talents in the school of Qa’ani, adopting the Iraqi style in her odes, the Saadi style in her ghazals, and sometimes following the style of Hafez.

The themes of her poems, which were compiled in a book titled Divan-e Gowhar or Gowhariyeh, mostly revolved around the praise of Shia Imams, Naser al-Din Shah, and his mother, Malek Jahan Khanom. Gowhar also wrote about the shah's sister, Princess Ezzat ed-Dowleh. She described her relationship with the princess as a “heteroerotic romance between her as lover and the princess as the perfect embodiment of human beauty”. In her writings she also referred to the shah's daughter as the “pearl of the kingly sea”, ‘the light of the whole world”, praising her beauty, her “silvery chest”, and her “sun-like face”.

Gowhariyeh contained 6,000 verses in various forms, including odes, ghazals, quatrains, qit'ahs, and mathnawis. This book was published in Isfahan in 1941 (1320 AH) by order of Ahmad Khan Fateh and was penned by Esmaeil bin Ahmad Khansari.

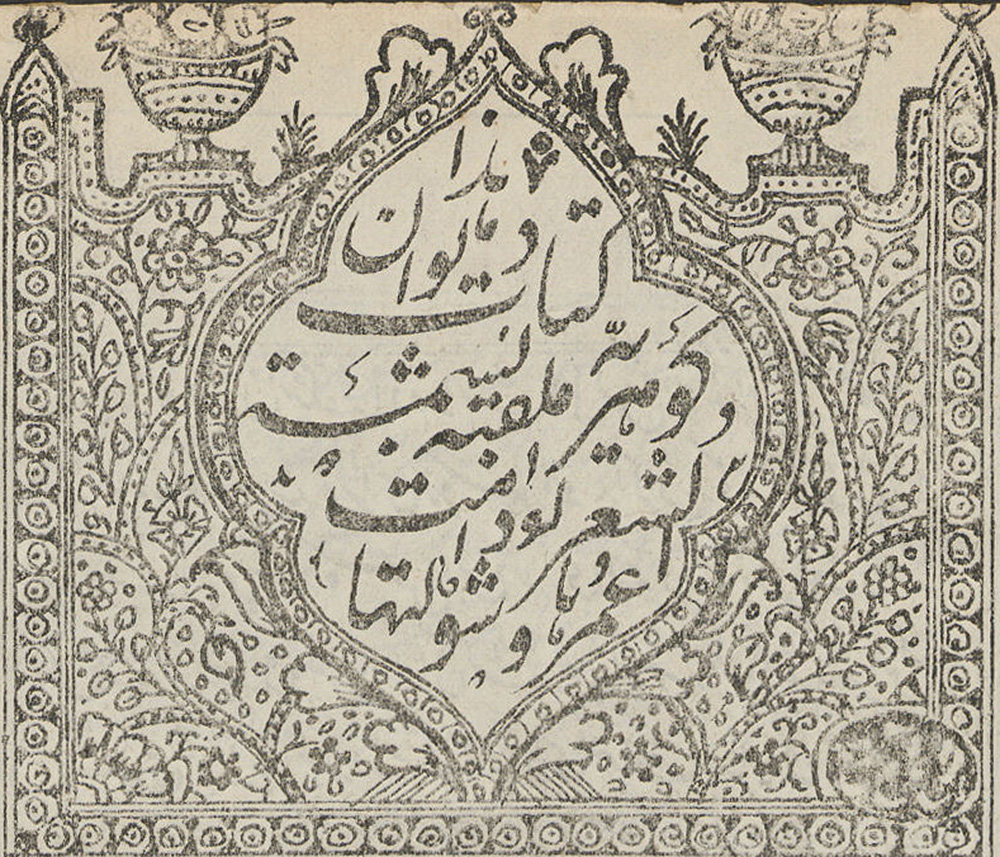
The mention of the name and title of Gowhar Qajar is found on the first page of the book Gowhariyeh (1902).

In the preface of her poetry collection, which was published in Isfahan in 1902 (1320 AH) with the support of Ahmad Fateh al-Molk, it is mentioned that Malek Jahan Khanom, the mother of Naser al-Din Shah, requested her to compose a poem in praise of Fatimah and to recite it at a gathering held for that occasion. Her success, described in the text as eloquence and fluency, led to her fame, and Naser al-Din Shah bestowed upon her the title "Shams al-Shu'ara" (Sun of the Poets).

The text states that she no longer composed poetry after Malek Jahan Khanom. It also mentions that she was alive until 1901 (1319 AH) when her collection of poems was handed over to the publisher. Since in this preface, the author, Gowhar Qajar, is mentioned using the past tense, her death likely occurred a year before the book's publication and almost simultaneously with the submission of the work to Fateh al-Molk in 1901.
