= Cevher Özden =

Turkish banker and businessman (1933 - 2008)

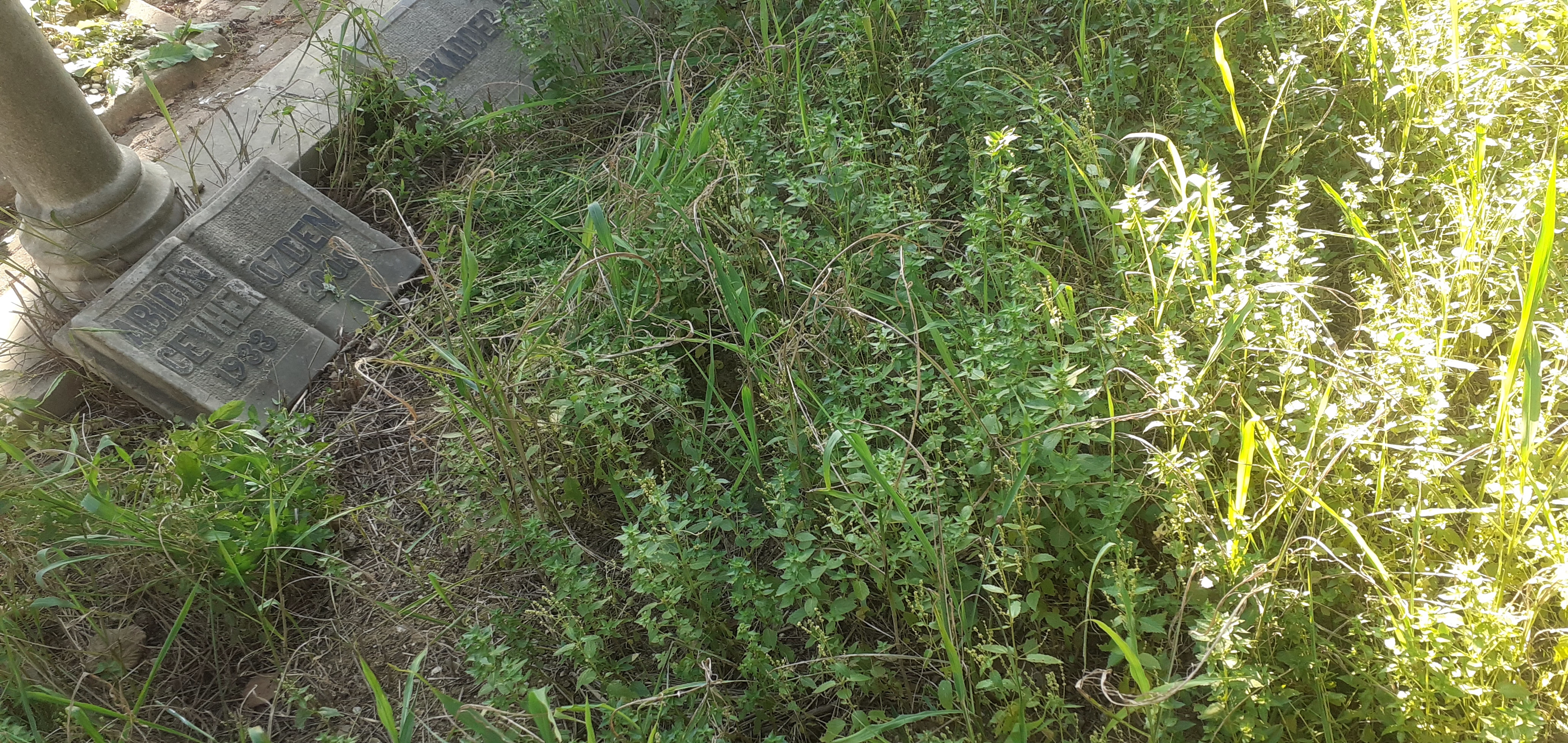
Cevher Özden grave

Cevher Özden (1933 – 2 June 2008) was a Turkish banker and businessman who, in 1981–1982, was at the heart of Turkey's biggest banking scandal. Both he and the chain of events are better known as Banker Kastelli, the name of the company he owned at the time and which took its name from the village near Sürmene, a small town in Trabzon province, where he was born. The village is now called Baştımar.

For more than three decades Cevher Özden had a successful and respected business career as a stock exchange agent in debt instruments. Then, like many others, he was caught up in the turbulence of the new economic climate created by the monetary reforms pushed forward by Turgut Özal, the Deputy Prime Minister at the time. Özden founded Banker Kastelli in 1980 and became the exclusive marketing agent for ten different banks. Before the end of the year, his business had grown so much that he controlled approximately US$2.5 billion worth of deposits entrusted to him by about 550,000 people. Özden's use of these funds for his own investment operations led to his being put under pressure by the banks and by his customers. New measures on monetary surveillance adopted by the Central Bank of Turkey in the summer of 1982 caused Özden to flee to Switzerland. One of the consequences of his abrupt disappearance was Özal's dismissal from his post in the cabinet.

Özden committed suicide in Kadıköy on 2 June 2008.
