= Al-Abbās ibn Said al-Jawharī =

9th century Islamic geometer

Al-Jawhari'
- العباس بن سعيد الجوهري
- Born: c. 800; Baghdad
- Died: c. 860 possibly Baghdad

Academic work
- Era: Islamic Golden Age
- Main interests: Mathematics, astronomy, geometry

Al-ʿAbbās ibn Saʿid al-Jawharī (Arabic: العباس بن سعيد الجوهري; c. 800 – c. 860), known as Al-Jawhari, was a geometer who worked at the House of Wisdom in Baghdad and for in a short time in Damascus, where he made astronomical observations. Born (and probably dying) in Baghdad, he was probably of Iranian origin. His most important work was his commentary on Euclid's Elements, which contained nearly 50 additional propositions and an attempted mathematical proof of the parallel postulate.

Described as having superb knowledge of Greek, which was unusual for a Muslim scholar, Al-Jawhari is credited with a translation into Arabic of the Indian polymath Shanaq al-Hindi's Book of Poisons.

== Sources ==
- Selin, Helaine (1997). Encyclopaedia of the History of Science, Technology, and Medicine in Non-Western Cultures. Berlin; New York: Springer Nature. ISBN 978-1-4020-4960-6.
- Treiger, Alexander (2022). "From al-Biṭrīq to Ḥunayn: Melkite and Nestorian Translators in Early ʿAbbāsid Baghdad". Mediterranea. 7: 143–181. doi:10.21071/mijtk.v7i.13666. S2CID 247928028.
