= Gowhar =

Gowhar or Guhar (Persian: گوهر) may refer to:

- Gowhar, Razavi Khorasan
- Gowhar, Sistan and Baluchestan
- Gowhar, Zanjan
- Gowhar Qajar, Iranian poet and astronomer of the Qajar era

== See also ==
- Dzhokhar, Jauhar, Jawhar, Jawahar, Jawaharlal, al-Jawhari or El-Gohary, Johar, Johari, Johri, Gauhar or Gohar, Gowhar
