= Jawhar (disambiguation) =

Jawhar is a city and municipal council in India.

Jawhar may also refer to:

== Given name ==
- Jawhar (general) (died 992), Fatimid general of the Byzantine Empire
- Jawhar bin Haydar bin ʽAli (c. 1837–1937), Ethiopian mystic and Islamic scholar
- Jawhar Jordan (born 1999), American football player
- Jawhar Mnari (born 1976), Tunisian former footballer
- Jawhar Namiq (1946–2011), first president of the Kurdistan National Assembly
- Jawhar Purdy (born 1991), Filipino-American basketball player
- Jawhar Sircar (born 1952), Indian politician and former government official

== Surname ==
- Hassan Jawhar (born 1960), Kuwaiti politician
- Mansour Jawhar (born 1995), Saudi Arabian football goalkeeper
- Sabria Jawhar (fl. early 21st century), Saudi Arabian journalist and columnist for the Arab News
- Athanasius IV Jawhar (1733–1794), Patriarch of the Melkite Greek Catholic Church

== Other uses ==
- Jawhar State, a former princely state in India

== See also ==
- Dzhokhar, Jauhar, Jawhar, Jawahar, Jawaharlal, al-Jawhari or El-Gohary, Johar, Johari, Johri, Gauhar or Gohar, Gowhar
