= Johri =

Johri and Jöhri are surnames. Notable people with the urnames include:

- Dinesh Johri
- Geetha Johri
- Mauro Jöhri
- Raajesh Johri
- Rahul Johri
- Sandeep Johri
- Vinod Johri

== See also ==
- Dzhokhar, Jauhar, Jawhar, Jawahar, Jawaharlal, al-Jawhari or El-Gohary, Johar, Johari, Johri, Gauhar or Gohar, Gowhar
- Johri Farm
