= Johar (disambiguation) =

Johar is an American Thoroughbred racehorse.

Johar may also refer to:

- Johar (name)
- Johar Valley
- Johar Town

== See also ==
- Johor
