= Gawhar Nasiba Khatun =

Princess of the Sultanate of Rum

Malika Ismat al-Din Gawhar Nasiba Khatun was an early 13th century princess of the Sultanate of Rum, the daughter of Kilij Arslan II and sister of Kaykhusraw I.

== Legends ==
According to legend, Gawhar Nasiba fell in love with a cavalry officer defending the palace of the Seljuk sultan at Konya. Her brother Kaykhusraw I opposed marriage between his sister and the officer so he sent the young man on various dangerous assignments and campaigns to ensure his death.

Overcome with grief at her lover's death, Gawhar Nasiba fell ill with tuberculosis. The remorseful Kaykhusraw visited her on her deathbed, asked to be forgiven, and offered to fulfill any last request she had. Gawhar Nasiba is reported to have replied: "I am very ill. There is no way for me to recover. None of these doctors can deliver me from my illness. I will eventually pass away. My wish is that you use my property to build a hospital in my honor. In this hospital, sick people should be treated with no charge and at the same time, incurable illnesses researched."

Historical record shows that Kaykhusraw carried out his sister's last request, beginning the hospital in Kayseri in 1204. The buildings were designed and built by an architect named Üstad Ömer. The entryway inscription, a common feature of Islamic architecture that usually records the architect's name, is missing, but the information is preserved in written sources elsewhere.

== Legacy ==
Today, Gawhar Nasiba is also the namesake of a magnificent complex at Kayseri comprising the former hospital, an adjoining madrasa devoted primarily to medical studies, and a mosque in Kayseri, Turkey. The complex (külliye in Turkish) that she endowed, is considered one of the preeminent monuments of Seljuk architecture.

The hospital was built between 1204 and 1206, and the madrasa, whose construction started immediately after Gawhar Nasiba's death in 1206, was finished in 1210.

The complex takes its name from the princess. The medrese within is known under a variety of names: the Gawhar Nasiba Madrasa; the Çifte Medrese (Twin Madrasa); or as the Gıyasiye Madrasa, after Ghiyath al-Din Kaykhusraw I, who was responsible for its construction. The tomb within the medrese is said to belong to Gevher Nesibe.

The complex as a whole represents the earliest surviving Seljuk medrese and hospital in Anatolia. There is no proof, however, that medical classes were given in Seljuk madrasas. The Seljuk hospitals in Anatolia, on one hand being a health facility, were also places where physicians were educated through a master-apprentice relationship.

The institution was reportedly the first hospital in the world that treat patients with mental disorders.

Gawhar Nasiba's Darüşşifa, or Şifahane, now functions as a public museum dedicated to medicine. The university hospital in Kayseri's Erciyes University was also named in memory of Gawhar Nasiba.

== Sources ==
- "History of Gevher Nesibe Hospital". Erciyes University. Archived from the original on 2012-07-02.
- İbrahim Shaikh. "A visit to Gevher Nesibe Medical Museum in Kayseri in Anatolia, Turkey" (PDF). The International Society for the History of Islamic Medicine.
- "Çifte Medrese (Twin Medrese) Kayseri, Turkey". Museum of Architecture. Archived from the original on 2007-06-06.
