= Jauhar =

Rajput wartime practice involving self-immolation

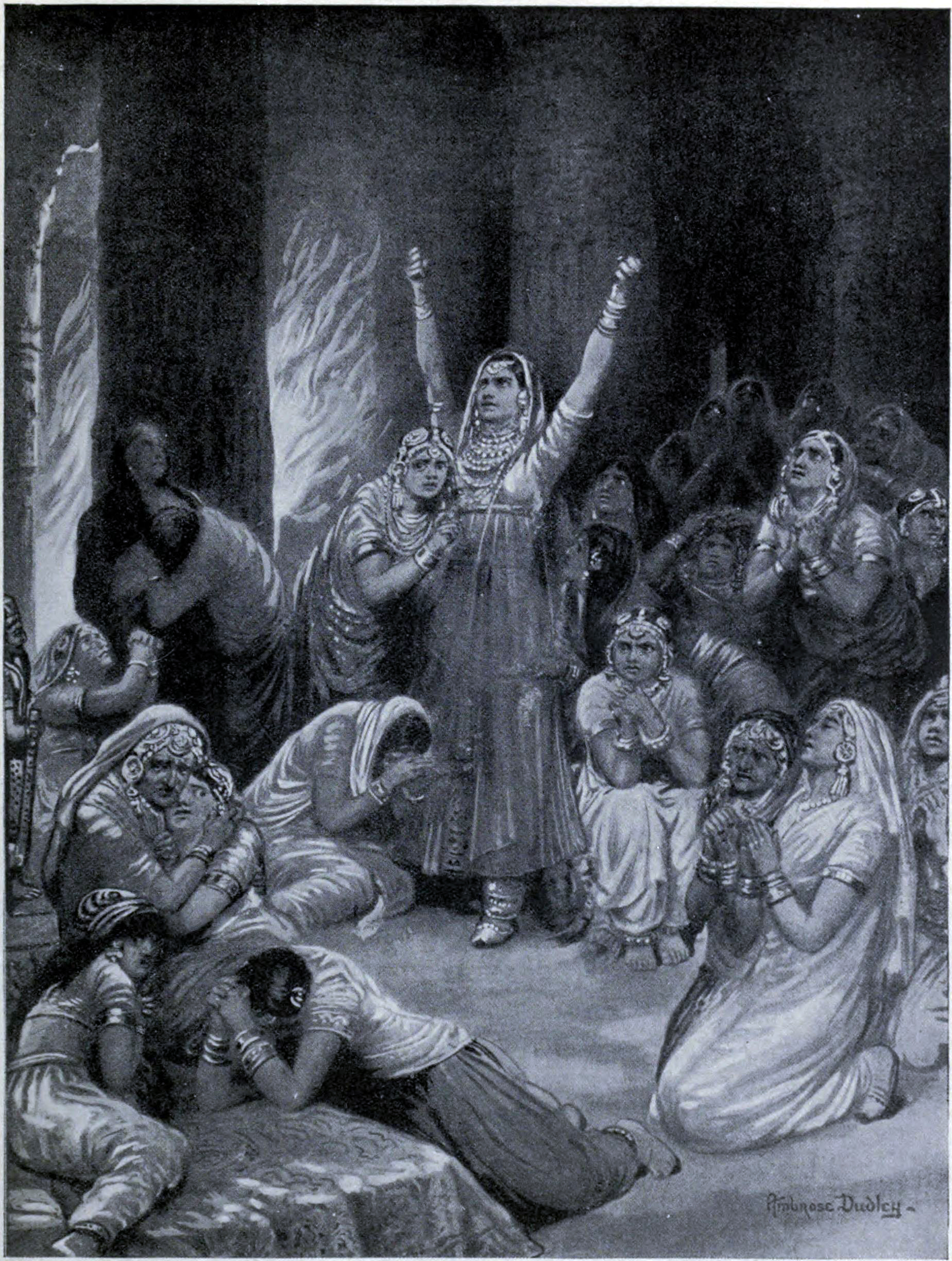
The Rajput ceremony of Jauhar, 1567, as depicted by Ambrose Dudley in Hutchinsons History of the Nations, c. 1910

Jauhar, sometimes spelled Jowhar or Juhar, was a practice of mass self-immolation by Rajput kshatriya women and girls in the Indian subcontinent to avoid capture, sex slavery, enslavement, and rape when facing certain defeat during a war. Some reports of jauhar mention women committing self-immolation along with their children to avoid rape by the invading armies. This practice was historically observed in the northwest regions of India, with the most famous jauhars in recorded history occurring during wars between Hindu Rajput kingdoms in Rajasthan and the opposing Muslim armies. Jauhar was only performed during war, usually when there was imminent defeat. It involved Hindu Rajput women committing suicide with their children and valuables in a massive fire, in order to avoid capture and abuse in the face of inescapable military defeat. At the same time or shortly thereafter, the men would ritualistically march to the battlefield expecting certain death, which in the regional tradition is called saka. This practice was intended to show that those committing it valued honor higher than own lives.

Jauhar in the Hindu kingdoms has been documented by Muslim historians of the Delhi Sultanate and the Mughal Empire. Among the most often cited examples of jauhar is the mass suicide committed in 1303 CE by the women of Chittorgarh fort in Rajasthan, when faced with the invading army of the Khilji dynasty of the Delhi Sultanate. The jauhar phenomenon was also observed in other parts of India, such as in the Kampili kingdom of northern Karnataka when it fell in 1327 to Delhi Sultanate armies.

There is an annual celebration of heroism called the Jauhar Mela in Chittorgarh where the local people commemorate their ancestors.

== Etymology ==
The word jauhar is connected to Sanskrit jatugr̥ha, meaning a "house plastered with lac and other combustible materials for burning people alive in". It has also been incorrectly interpreted to have been derived from the Persian gōhar, which refers to "gem, worth, virtue". This confusion, as author John Stratton Hawley states, rose from the fact that jivhar and jauhar were written in the same manner with the same letter used to denote v and u. Thus, jivhar has also came to be incorrectly associated with the meaning of jauhar.

== Practice ==
The practice of jauhar has been claimed as being culturally related to sati, with both being a form of suicide by women through self-immolation. However, the two are only superficially similar, with the underlying reason for both being significantly different. Sati was the custom of a Hindu widow committing suicide by sitting on her husband's funeral pyre. Jauhar was collective self-immolation by women in order to escape being captured and forced into slavery by invaders when defeat was imminent. Self-immolation was preferred over simple suicide because it would negate the possibility of any defilement of their dead bodies which their husbands, children and/or clansmen might have to watch.

Kaushik Roy states that jauhar was observed only during Hindu-Muslim wars, but not during internecine Hindu-Hindu wars among the Rajputs. John Hawley, however, disagrees with this assertion; he links it to the Greek conquerors who also captured Indian women, arguing that the practice of jauhar might have started with the Greek campaigns in the region. Veena Talwar Oldenburg disagrees as well, saying that "internecine warfare among the Rajput kingdoms almost certainly supplied the first occasions for jauhar, well before the Muslim invasions with which the practice is popularly associated" and that "the geopolitics of the northwest, whence a succession of invaders entered the subcontinent, made of Rajasthan a continual war zone, and its socially most respected community was therefore not the Brahmins but the Kshatriyas or Rajput castes, who controlled and defended the land. This history predates the coming of the Muslims by more than a millennium. Commemorative stones unearthed and dated in Rajasthan and Vijayanagara mark the deaths of both sexes. Their dates, which can be reliably determined, match perfectly the times and zones of war."

The phenomenon of jauhar has been reported and perceived by Hindus and Muslims differently. In Hindu traditions, jauhar was a heroic act by the women of a community facing certain defeat and abuse by the enemy. For Muslim historians, jauhar was portrayed as an act forced upon women by their culture. Amir Khusrau the poetic scholar described it, states Arvind Sharma – a professor of Comparative Religion, as "no doubt magical but nevertheless they are heroic".

== Occurrence ==
Among the most cited cases of jauhar are three occurrences at the fort of Chittaur (Chittaurgarh, Chittorgarh), in Rajasthan, in 1303, 1535, and 1568 CE. Jaisalmer was the scene of two occurrences of jauhar, one in the year 1299 CE, during the reign of the Alauddin Khalji, and another during the reign of the Tughlaq dynasty in 1326. Jauhar and saka were considered heroic acts, and the practice was glorified in the local ballads and folklore of Rajasthan.

=== Jauhar during invasion of Alexander of Macedon ===
The mass self-immolation by the Agalassoi tribe of northwest India is mentioned in Book 6 of The Anabasis of Alexander, Arrian's 2nd-century CE military history of Alexander the Great between 336 and 323 BCE. Arrian mentions Alexander's army conquering and enslaving peoples of the northwest Indian subcontinent. During a war that killed many in the Macedonian and Agalossoi armies, some 20,000 men, women and children of an Agalossoi town set fire to the town and immolated themselves when they came to believe that military defeat was imminent.

The Malli tribe also performed a similar act, which Pierre Herman Leonard Eggermont considers jauhar. Arrian states that they started burning their houses with themselves in it, though any Indian captured alive in their houses was slaughtered by the Greeks.

=== Jauhar of Sindh: Muhammad bin Qasim ===
In 712, Muhammed bin Qasim and his army attacked various kingdoms of the western regions of the Indian subcontinent. He laid siege to the capital of Raja Dahir, then the Hindu king in the area of Sind. After Dahir had been killed, the queen (Ladi) coordinated the defense of the capital for several months. As the food supplies ran out, she and the women of the capital refused to surrender, lit pyres and committed jauhar. The remaining men fought to their deaths at the hands of the invading army.

=== Jauhar of Gwalior: Iltutmish ===
Shams ud-Din Iltutmish, the Muslim sovereign of the Delhi Sultanate attacked Gwalior in 1232, then under control of the Rajputs. The Rajput women committed jauhar instead of submitting to Iltutmish's army. The place where the women committed mass suicide, in the northern end of the Gwalior fort, is known as Jauhar-tal (or Johar kund, Jauhar Tank).

=== Jauhar of Ranthambore: Alauddin Khalji ===
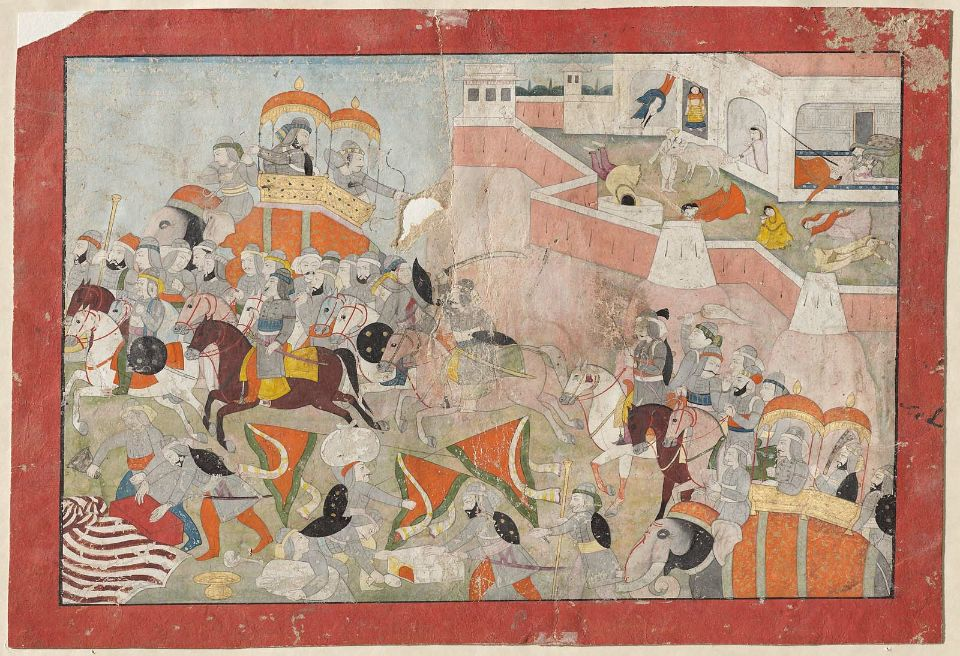
Sultan Alau'd Din put to Flight; Women of Ranthambhor commit Jauhar. Indian, Pahari style painting from c. 1825

In 1301, Alauddin Khalji of the Muslim Khalji dynasty, and a ruler of the Delhi Sultanate besieged and conquered the Ranthambore fort. When faced with certain defeat, the defending ruler Hammiradeva decided to fight to death with his soldiers, and his minister Jaja supervised the organization of a jauhar. The queens, daughters and other female relatives of Hammiradeva committed jauhar.

Hammiradev’s wife Rani Rang Devi and his daughter Padmala, along with other women, made the decision to commit jauhar in order to protect their honor from the invading Islamic army. However, they found no time to arrange a huge sacrificial fire and altar in which to commit jauhar, thus they committed mass suicide by jumping into the reservoir at the fort. In her honor, the reservoir has been named "Padmala Talav".

The jauhar at Ranthambore was described by Alauddin's courtier Amir Khusrau, which makes it the first jauhar to be described in a Persian language text.

=== First Jauhar of Chittor: Alauddin Khalji ===
According to many scholars, the first jauhar of Chittorgarh occurred during the 1303 siege of the Chittor fort. This jauhar became a subject of legendary Rajasthani poems, with Rani Padmini the main character, wherein she and other Rajput women commit jauhar to avoid being captured by Alauddin Khalji, a Muslim ruler of the Delhi Sultanate. The historicity of the first jauhar of Chittor is based on Rajasthani traditional belief as well as Islamic Sufi literature such as Padmavat by Malik Muhammad Jayasi.

=== Jauhar of Kampili: Muhammad bin Tughluq ===
The Hindu women of the Kampili kingdom of northern Karnataka committed jauhar when it fell in 1327 to the Muslim armies of the Delhi Sultanate ruled by Muhammad bin Tughluq.

=== Jauhar of Kuva: Mehmud Begada ===
In 1486, Khalil Khan, the prince of the Muzzafarid dynasty rebelled against Rana Vaghoji of Jhalavad. A battle took place between them near Saidpur, 6 km north of Dhrangadhra, where Jhalas gained a decisive victory. Khalil Khan was captured (although it was later released). Mahmud Begada accordingly marched towards Kuva (now Kankavati), which, at the time, was the capital of Jhalals. Rana Vaghoji assembled his vassals in his fort and prepared for battle. Rana Vaghoji lost the battle. In response, Vaghoji's 8 queens, along with 750 women committed Jal Jauhar by jumping into a well.

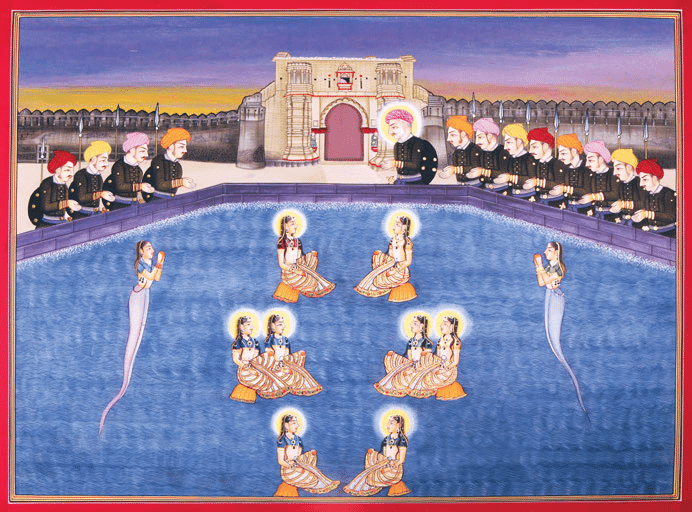
Jal Jauhar of Rana Vaghji's queens at Kuva, 1486

Rana Vaghoji, consumed by the grief of it all, decided to die on the battlefield. After Rana Vaghoji's death, Mahmud Begada sacked and destroyed the fort of Kuva. The day is known today as Kuva-no-ker (disaster of Kuva).

=== Jauhar of Chanderi: Babur ===
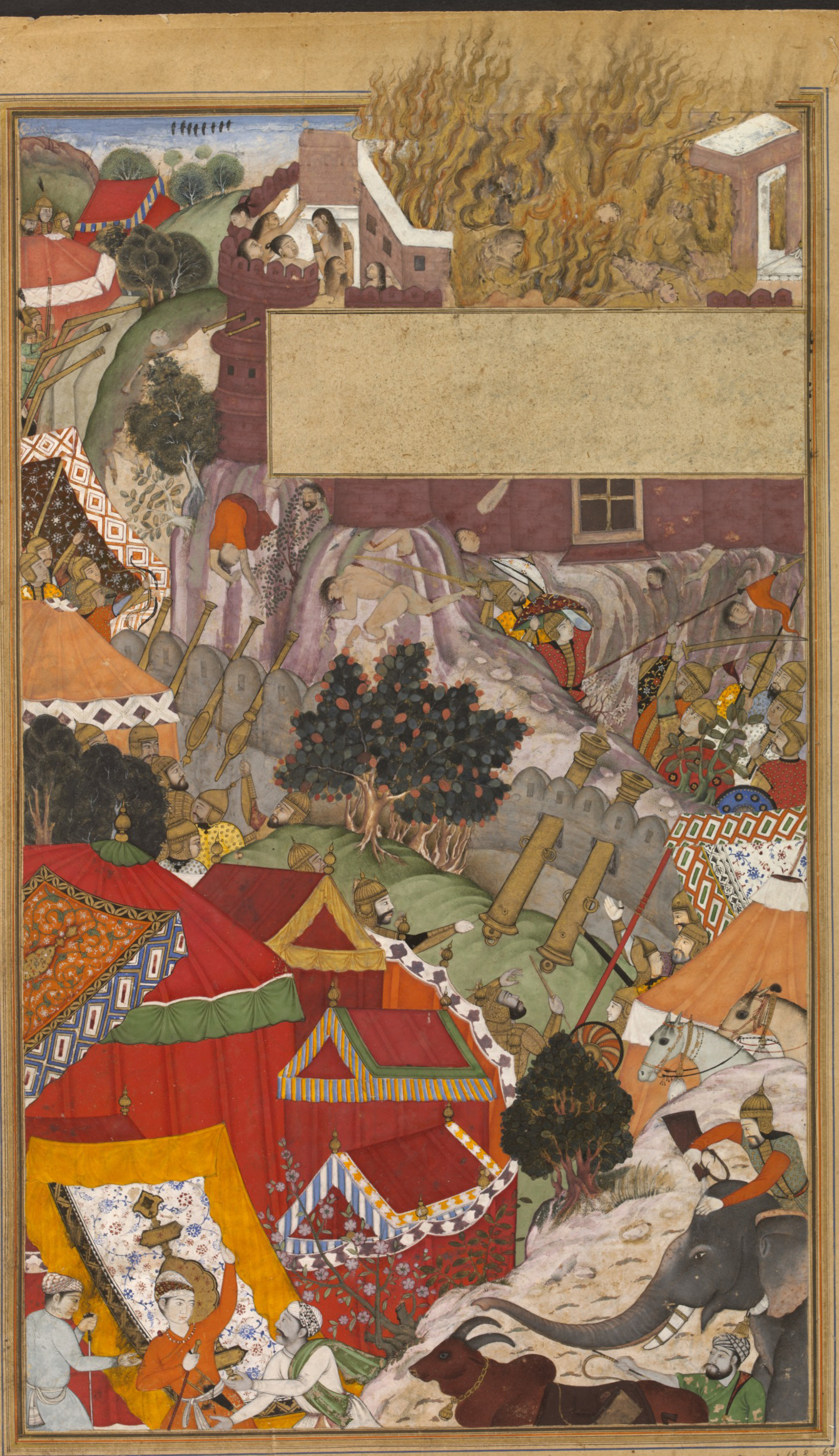
The self-immolation (jauhar) of the Hindu women, during the Siege of Chittorgarh in 1568

The Hindu Rajput king Medini Rai ruled over Chanderi in northern Madhya Pradesh in early 16th century. He tried to help Rana Sanga in the Battle of Khanua against the Muslim armies of Babur, the founder of the Mughal Empire. In January 1528 CE, his fort was overwhelmed by the invading forces of Babur. The women and children of the Chanderi fort committed jauhar, the men dressed up in saffron garments and walked the ritual of saka on 29 January.

=== Second Jauhar of Chittor: Bahadur Shah ===
Rana Sanga died in 1528 CE after the Battle of Khanwa. Shortly afterwards, Mewar and Chittor came under the regency of his widow, Rani Karnavati. The kingdom was besieged by the Muslim sultan Bahadur Shah of Gujarat. Rani committed Jauhar with other women on 8 March 1535, while the Rajput army rallied out to meet the besieging Muslim army and committed saka.

As Chittorgarh faced an imminent attack from the Sultan of Gujarat, Karnavati sought the assistance of the Mughal emperor Humayun to whom she had once offered a rakhi. Bahadur Shah sacked the fort for the second time. Karnavati, along with 13,000 other women, shut themselves in a building with gunpowder, lit it, and thus committed mass suicide.

However, the narrative of Karnavati sending Rakhi to Humayun is apparently a fictional story which wrongly became a part of folklore based on an unreliable gossip from the 17th century (200 years after the event). Contemporary Persian and Hindu authorities did not mention this story at all.

=== Third Jauhar of Chittor: Akbar ===
The armies of the Muslim Mughal Emperor Akbar besieged the Rajput fort of Chittor in September 1567. After his army conquered Chittorgarh in Rajasthan, Hindu women committed jauhar in the spring of 1568 CE, and the next morning, thousands of Rajput men walked the saka ritual. The Mughal army killed all the Rajputs who walked out of the fort. Abu'l-Fazl ibn Mubarak, who was not an immediate witness, gave a hearsay account of the event as seen by Akbar and his army. Abu'l-Fazl alleged that the women were victims of Rajput men and unwilling participants, and these Rajputs came out walking to die, throwing away their lives. According to David Smith, when Akbar entered the Chittorgarh fort in 1568, it was "nothing but an immense crematorium".

According to Lindsey Harlan, the jauhar of 1568 is a part of regional legend and is locally remembered on the Hindu festival of Holi as a day of Chittorgarh massacre by the Akbar army, with "the red color signifying the blood that flowed on that day".

=== Three Jauhars of Raisen: Humayun ===
Raisen in Madhya Pradesh was repeatedly attacked by the Muslim Mughal Army in the early 16th century. In 1528, the first jauhar was led by Rani Chanderi. After the Mughal army left, the kingdom refused to accept orders from Delhi. After a long siege of Raisen fort, that exhausted all supplies within the fort, Rani Durgavati and 700 Raisen women committed the second jauhar in 1532 while the men, led by Lakshman Tuar, committed saka. This refusal to submit to Mughal rule repeated, and in 1543 the third jauhar was led by Rani Ratnavali.

=== Jauhar of Bundelkhand: Aurangzeb ===
Aurangzeb's vast Muslim army laid siege to Bundela in Madhya Pradesh in December 1634 CE. The resident women committed jauhar as the fort fell. Those who had not completed the ritual and survived the jauhar in progress were forced into the harem. The men were forced to convert to Islam, whereas those who refused were executed.

=== Jauhar of Daddanala: Mir Fazlullah ===
In 1710 CE, Mir Fazlullah, a rebel Muslim Mughal amir, invaded Daddanala, a town in the Prakasam District of Andhra Pradesh that was the capital of the Dupati Sayapaneni Nayaks. As Sayapaneni Pedda Venkatadri Nayudu, who was in charge, died during the conflict, all the assembled Sayapaneni women set fire to the houses in the fort and were burnt to death. The five-year-old prince Mallikarjuna Nayudu was saved by a maidservant who smuggled him out through an orifice in the walls of the fort, and he was raised by his relatives.

=== Jauhar among Mughals ===
Practices like the jauhar was not limited to Hindus. Muslim rulers are recorded to have had their women killed in order to prevent any degradation of their honour. In 1617, facing defeat near Dhaka, Mughal governor Qasim Khan and his comrades beheaded their own wives to prevent their capture. This practice of jauhar, was a Rajput tradition assimilated into Mughal imperial culture through political and marital alliances and was now being practiced as far east as Bengal.

In his memoirs, Jahangir, who was a Muslim emperor of Hindustan, stated that his nobleman Khan-i-Jahan ordered his wives to commit jauhar during a battle with his enemy, Sher Shah Suri. During a war with the Ahom kingdom, Mirza Nathan ordered all Mughal women in his camp to be killed if he died. He later ordered them to perform jauhar.

== See also ==
- Honor suicide
- Akbarnama
- Puputan practice of Hindu kingdoms of Indonesia and Malaysia
- Seppuku
- Padmavat
