= Sayf ol-Dowleh =

Iranian prince of Qajar dynasty

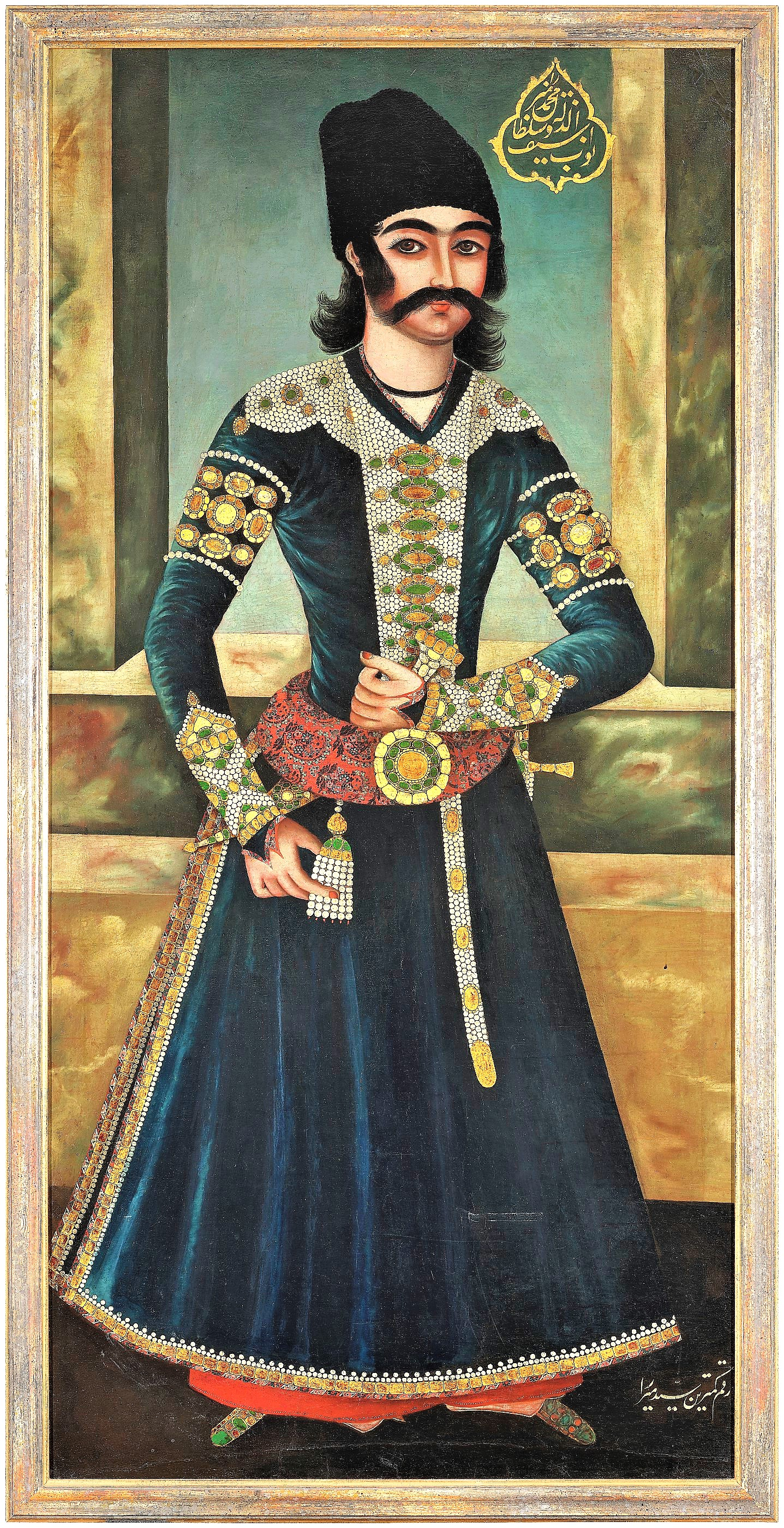
- Portrait of Sayf ol-Dowleh, signed by Seyyed Mirza, c. 1830–1835

Governor of Isfahan
- Tenure: 1820–1835
- Predecessor: Ali Mohammad Khan
- Successor: Khosrow Khan Gorji
- Lala: Yusef Khan-e Gorji
- Born: Soltan Mohammad Mirza; 7 June 1812; Tehran, Iran
- Died: 1899 (aged 86–87); Malayer, Iran
- Burial: Malayer
- Dynasty: Qajar
- Father: Fath-Ali Shah Qajar
- Mother: Taj ol-Dowleh

Soltan Mohammad Mirza (Persian: سلطان محمد میرزا; 7 June 1812 – 1899) better known by his honorific title Sayf ol-Dowleh (Persian: سیف الدوله) was an Iranian prince of the Qajar dynasty and the thirty-ninth son of Fath-Ali Shah Qajar, the second shah of Qajar Iran. He was the governor of Isfahan between 1820 and 1835 and contributed to its restoration after the damage it suffered during the civil war between the Zand dynasty and Agha Mohammad Khan Qajar, rebuilding several Safavid pavilions and designing his own palace.

The later period of his governorship in Isfahan was marred by riots, banditry along the roads and his rivalry with Mohammad Bagher Shafti, a major Shi'ia clergy figure, which resulted in a Jihad being invoked against Sayf ol-Dowleh. He suppressed the Jihad, but Isfahan was damaged again and a famine followed. Mohammad Shah Qajar ousted him and appointed Khosrow Khan Gorji in his stead. Sayf ol-Dowleh spent his days traveling and died in 1899 in Malayer. Unusually for his time, Sayf ol-Dowleh only married once, and later divorced his wife, Bahar Khanum. He had no children. Like many of his siblings, he loved poetry and writing, and was the author of several travelogues and a divan.

== Early life ==
Soltan Mohammad Mirza was born on 7 June 1812 as the thirty-ninth son of Fath-Ali Shah, the then reigning Shah of Iran. His mother, Taj ol-Dowleh (originally Tavus Khanum), was a Georgian concubine and later wife of Fath-Ali Shah. As an infant, Mohammad Mirza also had a Georgian wet nurse. From early childhood, the young prince was under the tutelage of many different tutors; according to his brother Iraj Mirza, (Note: Not to be confused with the poet Iraj Mirza.) Amanullah Khan Afshar was his Equestrian tutor, Agha Allah Verdi was his Lala and the poet Neshat taught him reading and writing. When Fath-Ali Shah was making a royal tour of Isfahan in 1820, he demanded a that tax be paid by the governor, Ali Mohammad Khan. When Ali Mohammad Khan refused, he was removed from office, and the position was given to Soltan Mohammad Mirza, who was given the title Sayf ol-Dowleh. Yusef Khan-e Gorji was also appointed as his regent.

Until the end of his regency, Sayf ol-Dowleh improved his writing skills, spending time in a literary circle which included the philosopher Zayn al-Abidin Shirvani, the poet Nezam Vafa Arani, and Mohammad Bagher Shafti, an influential cleric of the time, who became the regent of Sayf ol-Dowleh after the death of Yusef Khan. Through this circle, Sayf ol-Dowleh gained the attention of his other brothers, who were active in writing, like Soltan Ahmad Mirza, Farhad Mirza, and Najaf Qoli Mirza. It appears that Sayf ol-Dowleh eventually surpassed his brothers in the field of poetry, and wrote his first poems under the pseudonym "Sultan" at the age of sixteen.

== Governor of Isfahan ==
=== Administration and contributions ===
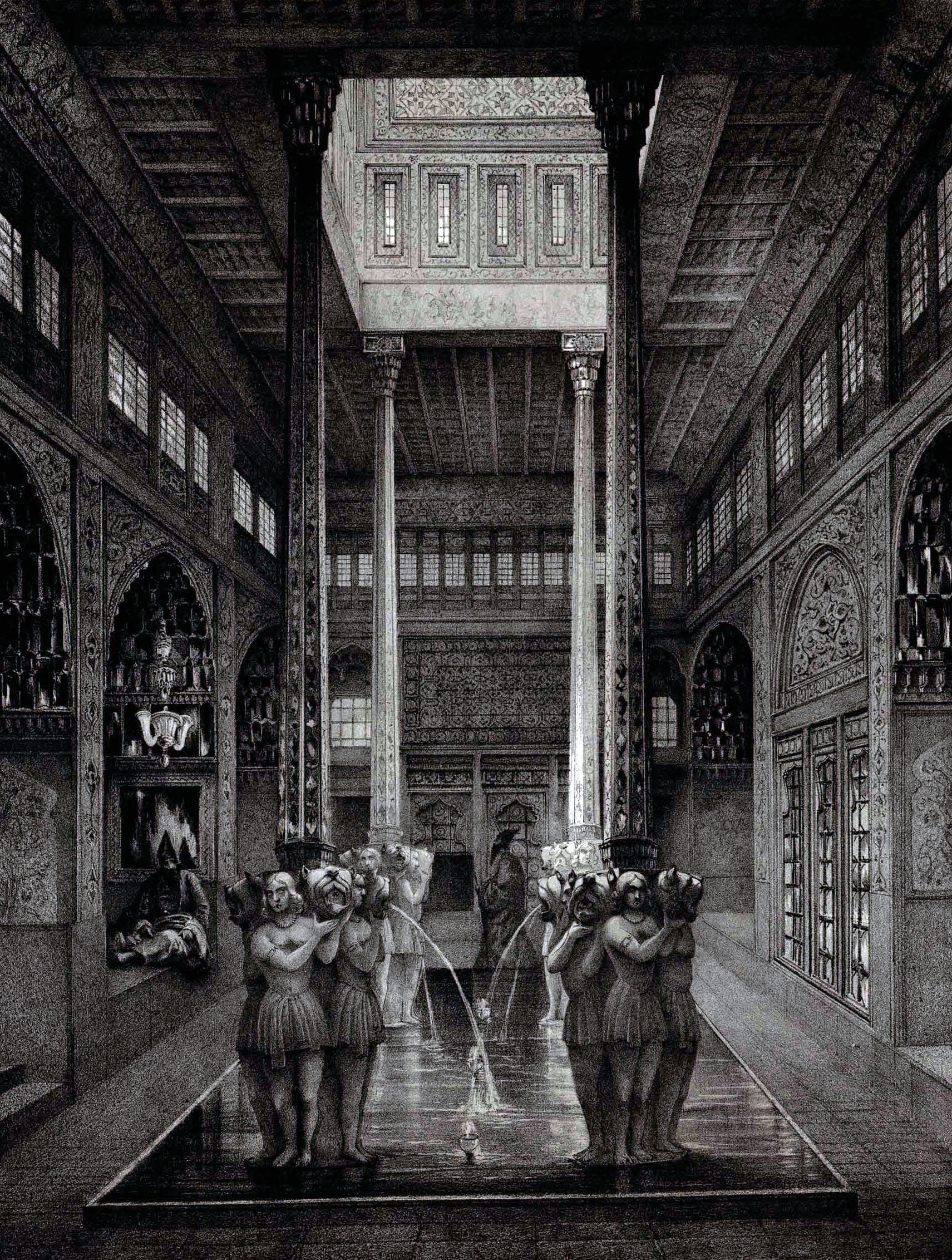
An illustration of a room in the Serpouchideh Palace by Eugène Flandin (1840)

In 1830, seeing that the Shah's local authority had weakened, Bagher Shafti decided to take over the government from Sayf ol-Dowleh. In June, Shafti marched with city guards towards Hasht Behesht, where Sayf ol-Dowleh lived, and engaged in a skirmish with Sayf ol-Dowleh's supporters. Shafti and his guards lost the fight and took refuge with the plenipotentiary of the British Empire in Iran, John McNeil, who resided in Isfahan at the time. Sayf ol-Dowleh seized power and ended Shafti's regency, although he later pardoned him, principally because of his influence over the city. After cementing his authority, Sayf ol-Dowleh ordered Hasht Behesht, which had been heavily damaged during the attack, to be reconstructed. He began to reform Isfahan, which had suffered economic and agrarian decline since the fall of the Safavids. He built the Tekiyah of the Prince's mother in honour of his childhood wet nurse, Maryam and restored the Vank Cathedral in order to secure his popularity among the Armenian residents of the city.

Sayf ol-Dowleh continued his reforms by restoring the city's barren farms, and arresting the outlaw groups that posed a constant threat to the lands adjacent to the city. He ordered the addition of several fountains and gardens to the Char Bagh Palace, where in 1831 he married Bahar Khanum, daughter of a chief of the Shahsevan tribe. However, his marriage did not last long and ended in divorce. Apart from rebuilding the old pavilions and palaces, Sayf ol-Dowleh also designed the Serpouchideh Palace, which included four ponds, a garden, a coffeehouse and a zoorkhaneh. This palace complex was destroyed by Mass'oud Mirza Zell-e Soltan, a later governor of Isfahan.

Sayf ol-Dowleh's plans for reforming the city were disrupted by the heavy taxes Fath-Ali Shah demanded, which was a result of prince-governors of other provinces refusing to pay their own taxes. Bakhtiari tribes in the area took advantage of this weakness, and in 1832 began to prey upon the roads to and from Isfahan. They looted the properties of merchants, disrupted the collection of taxes, and inspired so much fear that Sayf ol-Dowleh's own mother, Taj ol-Dowleh, canceled her trip to Tehran after having set out, and chose to reside in one of the villages near Isfahan instead.

=== Shafti's call for Jihad ===
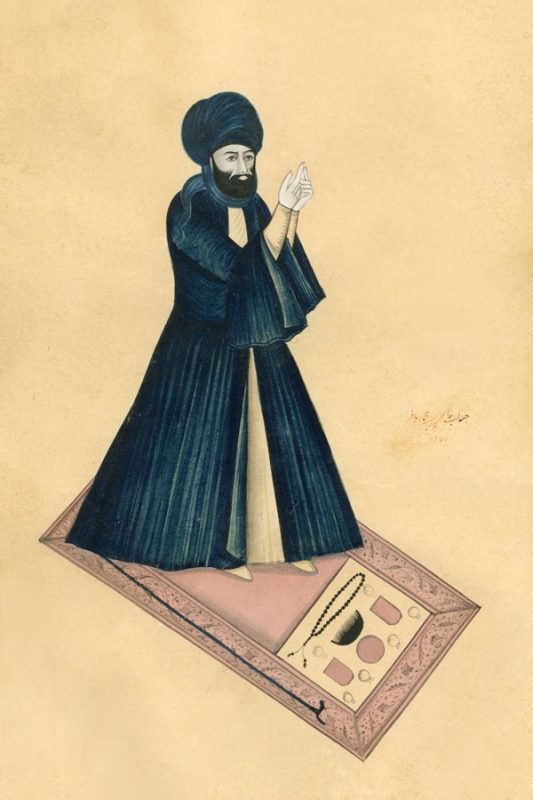
Mohammad Bagher Shafti, the mujtahid who was involved in a power struggle over Isfahan with Sayf ol-Dowleh

Towards the later years of his administration, Sayf ol-Dowleh was in a power struggle with Mohammad Bagher Shafti over the city. He tried to dilute Shafti's influence over Isfahan by empowering communities such as the Sufis and the Christians. In 1833, Mirza Mahdi Zavarei, a Sufi, was appointed Chancellor. Sayf ol-Dowleh ordered him to teach Sufi traditions to citizens, and encouraged conflicts between Shias and Sufis. Sayf ol-Dowleh also revoked the harsh rules against Christians and restored their place in society, letting them practise their beliefs. Many Christians who had left the city returned. Shafti felt threatened by the presence of Sufis and Christians, and in 1834 called for a Jihad against Sayf ol-Dowleh and his "blasphemous government". Sayf ol-Dowleh requested a large number of troops from Tehran to confront Shafti.

In the same year, Fath-Ali Shah died on his way to Isfahan, leaving the realm facing rebellions from powerful princes such as Hossein Ali Mirza. The crown prince, Mohammad Mirza had to face these revolts. Shafti refused to support Mohammad Mirza's succession and declared for Hossein Ali Mirza. Knowing that Ali Mirza could not resist the crown prince's forces, Sayf ol-Dowleh joined the latter's supporters and confronted Shafti with his troops with flags that declared them as "the Iranian army". Shafti, in counteract, called for the bandits of Saadatabad led by Abol Ghasem Bolandeh and Baba Qoli Chamelani who looted the northern parts of the city. Shafti resided in Bidabad claiming himself as the Governor of Isfahan. Sayf ol-Dowleh divided his troops into two groups. One under the command of David Saginian, focused on attacking Chamelani and Blandeh, the other under his own command, sought to overcome Shafti's forces in Bidabad and to arrest him. On 4 December 1834, an army under the command of Shoja-al-Saltana on behest of Ali Mirza entered Isfahan and occupied the city. A month later when Manouchehr Khan Gorji defeated Shoja al-Saltana and marched towards Fars. As soon as news of Hossein Ali Mirza's defeat in Shiraz reached Isfahan, Shafti surrendered and lost all of his belongings.

=== Removal from Isfahan government ===
After defeating his uncles, Mohammad Shah established his authority and suppressed the rebellion. Shafti's revolt however had damaged Isfahan and its surroundings, and the city also suffered from famine the same year. When Mohammad Shah marched to Isfahan and in retribution, executed many members of the city's aristocracy and confiscated their property. He took Sayf ol-Dowleh's mother hostage and detained her for three years in Tehran. Sayf ol-Dowleh was ousted from the government of Isfahan on the orders of Haji Mirza Aqasi, the grand vizier of the Shah, who, for unknown reasons, distrusted Sayf ol-Dowleh and persuaded Mohammad Shah to dismiss him. In 1835, on the behest of Mohammad Shah, Khosrow Khan Gorji arrived in Isfahan, sent Sayf ol-Dowleh to Tehran and became the governor himself.

== Later years ==
=== From Baghdad to Kairouan ===
Mohammad Shah initially distrusted Sayf ol-Dowleh, but it appears that the distrust waned. Sayf ol-Dowleh was present in Mohammad Shah's campaign of Herat in 1837-1838. He even offered solutions to the problems of equipment for the artillery. He suggested the use of a particular kind of white and very hard stone for manufacturing cannons, which were used later in the campaign. When the war ended, Sayf ol-Dowleh decided to settle with his mother in Najaf, where he bought land and began a mercantile career.

In 1848 Naser al-Din Shah ascended the throne, and Sayf ol-Dowleh began a long journey which he recorded in a travelogue. His first stop was in Baghdad, where he stayed for six years. There he wrote his most renowned work, Sayf al-Resail. In January 1852, he left Baghdad for Diyarbakır and went on to Aleppo, Homs, Alexandria and Kairouan, returning to Iran from Istanbul. While traveling, he maintained a correspondence with his nephew, Holaku Mirza. From his letters it can be concluded that he was in a state of melancholia and loneliness. He also deeply regretted his failure to complete the various initiatives he had commenced while governing Isfahan.

=== Custodian of Astan Quds Razavi ===
On his return, Naser al-Din Shah appointed Sayf ol-Dowleh as Ajudan-Bashi (adjudant-en-chef) of his court. Sayf ol-Dowleh however abandoned his titles and went on another journey across Iran. He visited Mashhad, Isfahan, Kashan, and Qazvin, where he settled until 5 March 1872, when Naser al-Din Shah appointed him as the Custodian of Astan Quds Razavi. As custodian, his used the title Moin al-Molk, instead of Sayf ol-Dowleh.

Sayf ol-Dowleh ordered the expansion of the Imam Reza Shrine library, adding extensive numbers of shelves made of pine wood. His other services include repairing aqueducts and farms, and increasing his household staff. Sayf ol-Dowleh's period as Custodian ended in 1874 when he returned to Tehran.

=== Death ===
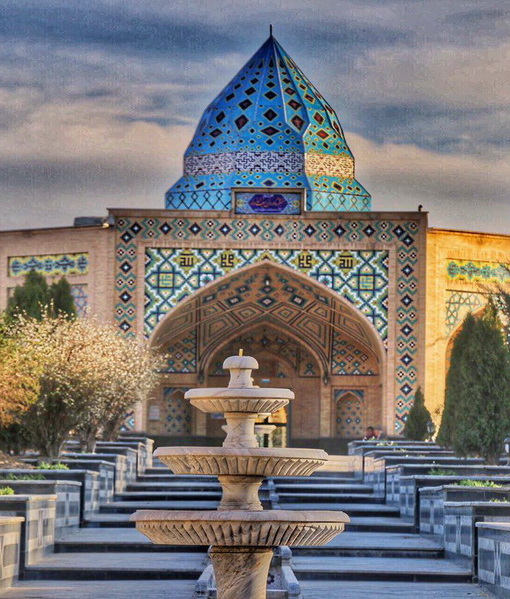
Tomb of Sayf ol-Dowleh in Malayer

Sayf ol-Dowleh's last journey was with Naser al-Din Shah on his royal tour to Mazandaran in 1876. He then retired from government and settled in Malayer. Naser al-Din Shah, as a token of gratitude, granted the entire city to him. During his stay in Malayer, the plight of the residents prompted Sayf ol-Dowleh to endow all of Malayer's assets and title deeds to the people.

Sayf ol-Dowleh died in 1899, leaving no children of his own to pay for his funeral. The people of Malayer built a tomb for him which remains one of the city's modern tourist attractions.

== Related bibliography ==
- Ahangaran, Amir (2013). "An investigation of the reasons for Mohammad Shah Qajar's defeat in returning the sovereignty of Iran to Herat (1835 – 1839)" (PDF). Journal of Historical Research (in Persian) (17): 131–147.
- Ashrafi, Parisa (2016). "Study on the changes in the structure of Isfahan in different historical periods". Journal of Urban Management Studies (in Persian) (3): 45–69.
- Chegini, Mohammad (2010). "Saif al-Dawla endowments in Malayer". Payam Baharestan (in Persian) (7): 708–731.
- Dodangeh, Soghra (2007). "Taj al-Dowleh Isfahani". The Great Islamic Encyclopaedia (in Persian). Tehran. pp. 212–213.
- Farmanfarmaian, Fatema Soudavar (2011). "An Iranian Perspective of J. B. Fraser's Trip to Khorasan in the 1820s". Iranian Studies. 44 (2): 217–242. doi:10.1080/00210862.2011.541692. S2CID 162041391.
- Hambly, Gavin R. G. (1982). "Ḥosayn- ʿAlī Mīrzā Farmānfarmā". Encyclopædia Iranica, online edition. New York.
- Homai, Mahdokht Banu (2016). History of Rulers of Isfahan (in Persian). Isfahan: Institute of Humanities and Cultural Studies. ISBN 9789644264979.
- Javidan, Mina (2017). Tourism and travel in the Qajar period (in Persian). Tehran: Arun Publications. ISBN 9789642319664.
- Ma'ani, Ahmad Golchin (1967). "Haj Mirza Aghasi and Sultan Mohammad Mirza". Yaghma (in Persian) (20): 47–52.
- Maeda, Hirotake (2009). "Ḵosrow Khan Gorji Qājār". Encyclopædia Iranica, online edition. New York.
- Masjedi, Hossein (Summer 2002). "Sayf ol-Dowleh". Isfahan Journal of Sociology (in Persian). 13 (13): 67–90.
- Naghdi, Reza (2021). History and organization of Astan Quds Razavi in the Qajar era (in Persian). Mashhad: Astan Quds Razavi Islamic Research Foundation. ISBN 9786000604592.
- Parsa, Forough (Autumn 2014). "Seyyed Mohammad Baqir Shafti and interference in government based on the theory of the Deputation of Mujtahids". Historical Inquiries (in Persian). 10 (2): 21–39.
- Sharghi, Masoud (1983). "The situation of two Jewish and Christian minorities in Iran during the Qajar period". Quarterly Journal of History Research (in Persian) (41): 123–160.
- Walcher, Heidi (2001). "Face of the Seven Spheres: The Urban Morphology and Architecture of Nineteenth-Century Isfahan (Part Two)". Iranian Studies. 34 (1–4): 117–139. doi:10.1080/00210860108702000. S2CID 145640514.
- Walcher, Heidi (2006). "Isfahan viii. Qajar Period". Encyclopædia Iranica, online edition. New York.
- Yaghmai, Habib (Autumn 1948). "Sultan Muhammad Mirza Saif al-Dawlah". Yaghma (in Persian). 13 (10): 462–465.
