= Taj ol-Dowleh =

Iranian royal consort, calligrapher and poet (d.1881)

Taj ol-Dowleh تاج‌الدوله
- Khanum
- Born: Tavus Khanum (Persian: طاووس خانم, romanized: Tāvus Xānom) ?
- Died: 1881
- Burial: Najaf
- Spouse: Fath-Ali Shah Qajar
- Issue: Sayf ol-Dowleh; Soltan-Ahmad Mirza Azod od-Dowleh; Farokhsir Mirza Naier ol-Dowleh; Shirinjan Khanum; Khorshid-Kolah Khanum Shams ol-Dowleh; Morasa Khanum
- House: Qajar

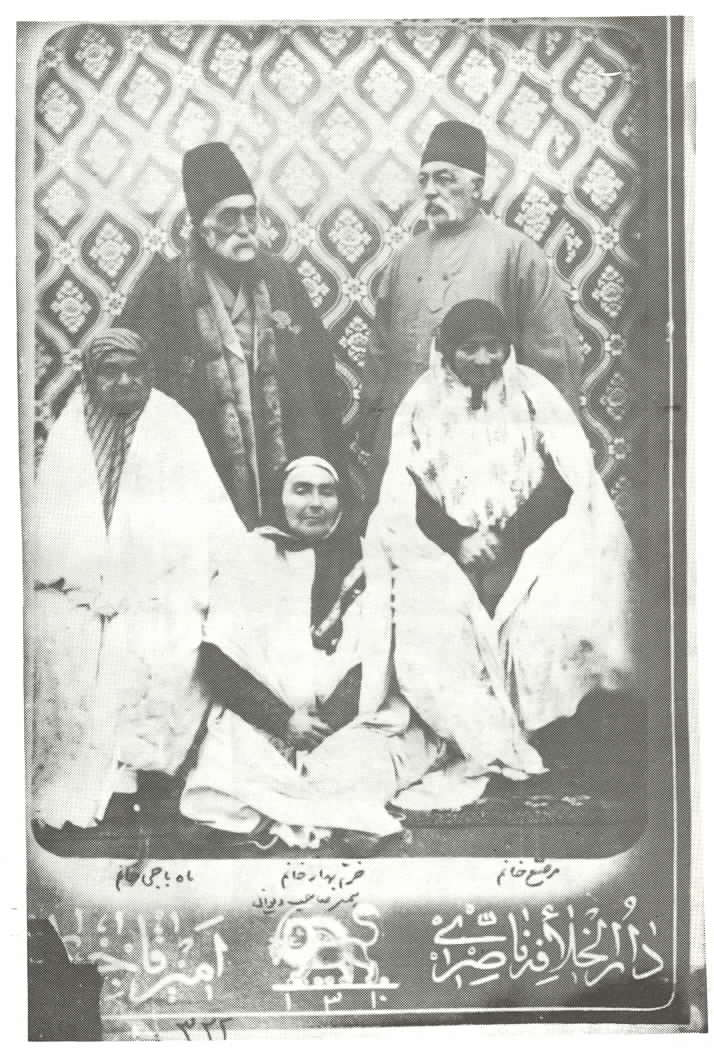
Fath-Ali Shah's children. First woman from right is Morasa Khanum and the man on the left is Soltan Ahmad Mirza Azod od-Dowleh

Taj ol-Dowleh (Persian: تاج‌الدوله, died 1881) was the forty-second wife of Fath-Ali Shah Qajar and a poet. Her birth name was Tavus Khanum (Persian: طاووس خانم, romanized: Tāvus Xānom) and she was of Georgian descent. She was born in Isfahan. She was one of the favored and beloved wives of the Shah. She was among the most powerful, influential, and impactful consorts of Fath-Ali Shah, exerting the greatest influence over him. The Shah would not take any action without consulting her.

== Life ==
She married Fath-Ali Shah in 1845 when she was 15 years old. The shah changed the name of the Sun Throne to Tavus Throne on the occasion of this marriage. It was a so called temporary marriage, which means she was classificed as a concubine rather than a legal wife. She was educated under the supervision of Neshat Esfahani. After a while the shah ordered the construction of a mansion for her because of his passionate love. Moreover, a part of the royal treasury, called the special treasury, was entrusted to her. Every Nowruz she invited the shah along with his wives and married daughters to her mansion for thirteen days.

At the moment of the shah's death, she was beside him in Isfahan and after that she took refuge to Mohammad Bagher Shafti from the princes' clashes for the throne. After the enthronement of Mohammad Shah Qajar she donated all of her jewelry to him and went on a Hajj trip with her son, Sayf ol-Dowleh. After some Hajj trips she went to Najaf and lived there until the end of her life. Her cemetery is in Imam Ali's apron.

She had six children: Soltan Mohammad Mirza Sayf ol-Dowleh, Soltan-Ahmad Mirza Azod od-Dowleh, Farokhsir Mirza Naier ol-Dowleh, Shirinjan Khanum, Khorshid-Kolah Khanum Shams ol-Dowleh (she was married to Mirza Mohammad-Ali Khan Nezam ol-Dowleh and her daughter, Shams ol-Molouk, married Aga Khan II) and Morasa Khanum.

== Political life ==
She was a powerful and capable woman, with an independent and magnificent palace and a vast household. The Shah would not take any action without her permission. Tavous Khanum held great influence over the Shah, to the extent that many court nobles would turn to her to resolve their problems. This high-ranking and talented lady was a wife of Fath-Ali Shah Qajar, and the splendor and grandeur of her household were beyond imagination. For this reason, the Shah bestowed upon her the title of Taj-ol-Dowleh.Taj-ol-Dowleh’s favor and status reached such heights that, by the order of Fath-Ali Shah, a magnificent palace was built for her residence, giving her an independent court. A portion of the royal treasury, known as the “private treasury,” was also entrusted to her. Every Nowruz, for thirteen days, Taj-ol-Dowleh would host the Shah in her palace along with his entire harem and married daughters. It was the Shah’s custom that each month, during the observation of the new moon, he would look upon Taj-ol-Dowleh after consulting the mirror and the Quran.Lady Sheil also writes in her memoirs that the Shah’s wives generally did not possess significant power or status, except for Taj-ol-Dowleh, before whom many of the Qajar nobles were at service.

Tavous Khanum quickly gained a special position in the harem and at court. The Shah conferred upon her the title of Taj-ol-Dowleh and, through Mirza Abdolvahab Neshat Esfahani (a poet and calligrapher), sent her a jewel-encrusted ‘anbarcheh’ as a royal gift. By the Shah’s order, two female masters of music and singing were appointed to teach Tavous Khanum. She also began learning reading and writing, and as her talent for learning became evident, Fath-Ali Shah instructed Neshat Esfahani to take charge of her instruction in calligraphy. Apart from the Shah, Bardi Khanum (Tavous Khanum’s music teacher), Agha Mohammad Reza’s daughter (a musician), and a few female singers, none of the harem members visited Tavous Khanum’s residence. Her administration was overseen by Mirza Hossein, the nephew of Mirza Agha Khan Nouri. Mah Sheref Barghani, known as Manshieh, from the Barghani family and aunt of Mohammad Taqi Shaheed Salis, along with Molla Mohammad Saleh Barghani, were also assigned to write her letters and documents.

Apparently, the British government also sought to leverage her influence for advancing its policies through McNeil, Tavous Khanum’s physician, who had saved her from a serious illness. On one occasion, Tavous Khanum even hosted a gathering for the British.

Khajehs such as Agha Mubarak, Agha Seyed Ebrahim, and Gholam-Taj, all of whom served in Taj-ol-Dowleh’s private quarters, enjoyed such authority that, according to popular expression, “due to their prestige, they owed allegiance to no one.” In the days when Taj-ol-Dowleh was at the height of respect and influence, it was customary that whenever she entered a hall, any woman attending to Fath-Ali Shah would immediately rise. Despite her own youth and esteemed position, it was often observed that when Agha Begum entered a room while Taj-ol-Dowleh was massaging the Shah’s hands and feet, she would rise out of respect for this venerable elder. Agha Begum would then sit, kindly take Taj-ol-Dowleh’s hand, and seat her beside the Shah.

One day, Fath-Ali Shah presented her with a jewel-encrusted ‘anbarcheh’, the very same precious gift that the Empress of Russia had sent to Agha-Baji, daughter of Ebrahim Khan Shush. This exquisite gem featured a large emerald at its center, surrounded by a row of exceptional diamonds, with two strands of fine gold chains attached. The Shah purchased it for eighty thousand rials and bestowed it upon Taj-ol-Dowleh. He also granted fifty thousand rials as a royal gift to Mirza Abdolvahab, Tavous Khanum’s instructor and the calligrapher who had written her title, Taj-ol-Dowleh.

In Tehran, the part of the palace that was under Taj-ol-Dowleh’s control was considered one of the most beautiful architectural works in the world. Tavous Khanum also had a summer residence in the village of Emamzadeh Qasem. Taj-ol-Dowleh spent her summers at her country estate in Emamzadeh Qasem.

== Skill ==
Taj-ol-Dowleh was a poet. She engaged in composing poetry, and her works have appeared sporadically in various sources. She was also skilled in the art of calligraphy. Her instructor, Abdolvahab Esfahani, known as Neshat and titled Mo’tamed-ol-Dowleh, devoted great effort to her training, teaching her both the art of elegant writing and refined expression. Under Neshat’s guidance, Taj-ol-Dowleh progressed so skillfully in writing that her letters were filled with fresh ideas and beautifully meaningful expressions.
