= 1844 in Iran =

- Decades
- See also: Other events of 1844; Years in Iran

The following lists events that happened during 1844 in the Qajar era.

== Incumbents ==
- Monarch: Mohammad Shah Qajar

== Births ==
- July 6 – Ahmad Moshir al-Saltaneh, Iranian politician and calligrapher.
- ? – Fazlullah Nouri, Iranian Shi'a theologian.
- ? – Wafayi, Kurdish poet.
- ? – ʻAbdu'l-Bahá, son of Bahá'u'lláh and leader of the Bahá'í Faith.
- ? – Mírzá Abu'l-Faḍl, Iranian Bahá'í scholar and religious writer.

== Deaths ==
- March 22 – Mohammad Bagher Shafti, Iranian imam.
