= Seyyed Mosque =

Seyyed Mosque may refer to:

- Seyyed Mosque (Isfahan), mosque from the Qajar era in Isfahan
- Another name for the Jameh Mosque of Zanjan, congregational mosque of Zanjān city, Iran
