= Vajihollah Mirza Sepahsalar =

Iranian prince and statesman (1854–1905)

Vajihollah Mirza
- Sayf ol-Molk; Sardar-e Moazzam; Amirkhan Sardar; Sepahsalar
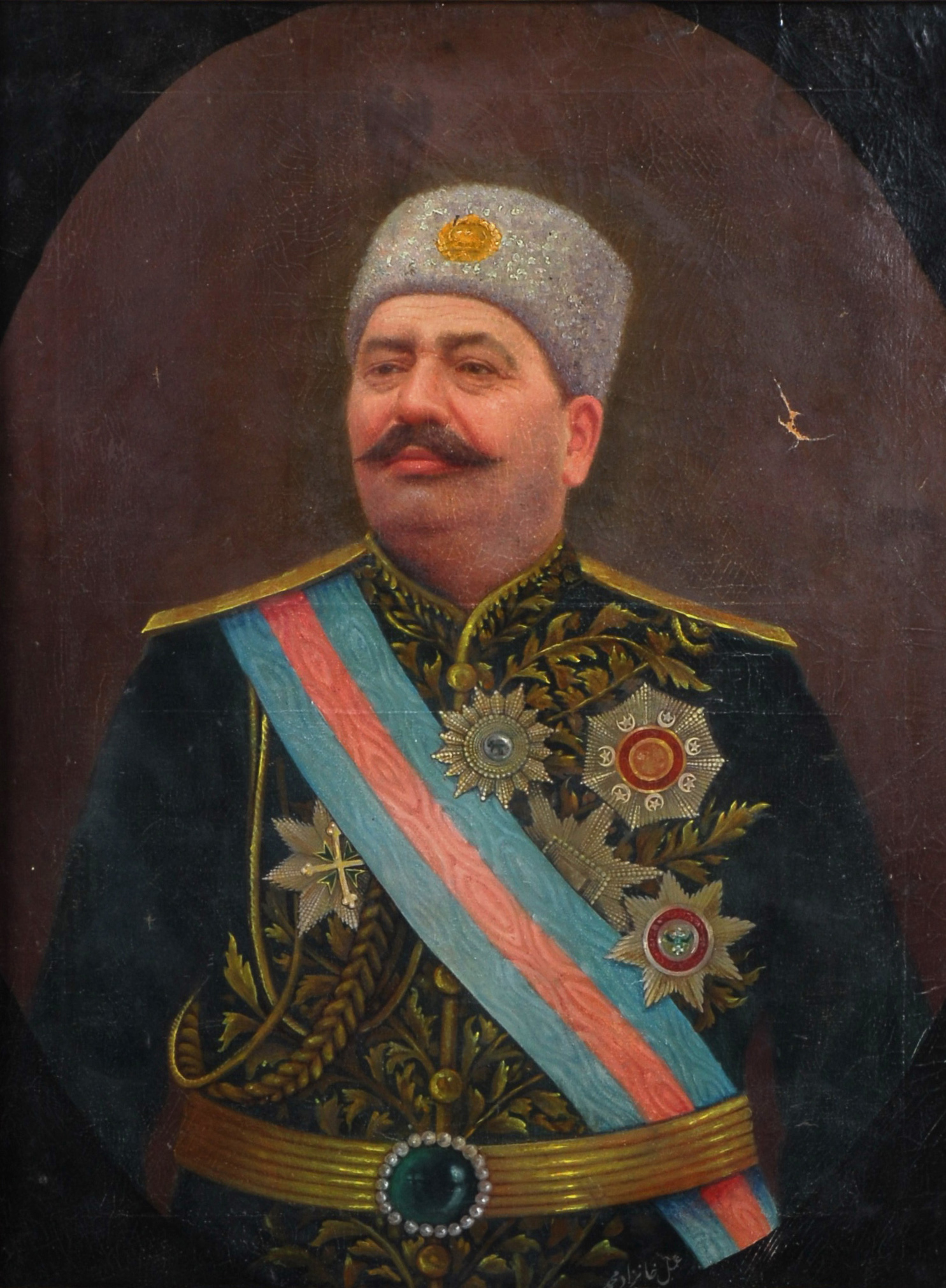
- Portrait by Kamal-ol-molk, 1890s

Minister of War
- In office: October 1897 – 18 January 1905
- Predecessor: Abdol-Hossein Farman Farma
- Successor: Kamran Mirza Nayeb es-Saltaneh
- Monarch: Mozaffar ad-Din Shah (r. 1 May 1896 – 8 January 1907)
- Born: Vajihollah Mirza; 1854
- Died: 1905 (aged 50–51)
- Dynasty: Qajar
- Father: Soltan-Ahmad Mirza Azod od-Dowleh
- Religion: Twelver Shi'ism
- Occupation: Statesman, official
- Military career
- Rank: Commander-in-chief
- Commands: Qajar Army

Vajihollah Mirza (Persian: وجیه‌الله میرزا; 1854 – 1905) was a Qajar prince and statesman under Naser al-Din Shah and Mozaffar ad-Din Shah.

== Biography and career ==
Vajihollah Mirza was born to Soltan-Ahmad Mirza Azod od-Dowleh in 1854.

During the reign of Naser al-Din Shah, Vajihollah Mirza demonstrated great courage in suppressing the Turkmens who sacked caravans of pilgrims traveling to Imam Reza Shrine. This contributed to his subsequent advancement. E'temad os-Saltaneh wrote in his memoirs that Vajihollah Mirza was defeated in a battle against the Turkmens in Astarabad, but nevertheless received a promotion. In October 1897, Vajihollah Mirza was appointed the Minister of War. In 1899 or 1900, Vajihollah Mirza was granted the title of Sepahsalar and appointed Commander-in-Chief of the Iranian Army.

After Vajihollah Mirza became Sepahsalar, Mozaffar ad-Din Shah appointed twelve commanders to oversee the army: Amir Bahador Jang, Mohammad-Baqer Khan Amir Nezam, Azizollah Mirza Zafar al-Saltaneh, Zayn al-Abedin Khan Amir Afkham, Mohammad-Sadeq Khan Amir Tupkhaneh-ye Qajar, Mohammad Ali Khan Sardar-e Afkham, Vazir-e Nezam, Zafar od-Dowleh, Mirza Ahmad Khan Ala od-Dowleh, Gholam-Reza Khan Inanlu (Asaf od-Dowleh), Abdollah Khan Nazem os-Saltaneh and Mohammad Vali Khan Tonekaboni.

== Sources ==
- Soleimani, Karim (2000). القاب رجال دوره قاجاریه [Titles of Qajar-era Notables] (in Persian). Tehran: Nashr-e Ney. ISBN 964-312-484-3.
- E'temad os-Saltaneh, Mohammad Hasan Khan (1966). Afshar, Iraj (ed.). روزنامه خاطرات اعتمادالسلطنه [Diary of E'temad os-Saltaneh] (in Persian). Tehran: Amir Kabir Publishers.
- Behzadi, Mohammad Reza. "شاهزاده وجیه‌الله میرزا سپهسالار" [Prince Vajihollah Mirza Sepahsalar)]. Institute for Iranian Contemporary Historical Studies (in Persian). Archived from the original on 26 March 2013.
- Sepehr, Abd al-Hosayn Khan (2006a). Navai, Abd al-Hosayn (ed.). مرآت الوقایع مظفری و یادداشت‌های ملک‌المورخین [Mirror of the Mozaffari Events and Notes of Malek al-Movarrekhin] (in Persian). Vol. 1. Tehran: Markaz-e Pazhuheshi-ye Mirath-e Maktub.
- Sepehr, Abdolhossein (2006b). Navaei, Abdolhossein (ed.). مرآت الوقایع مظفری [Mirror of the Mozaffari Events)] (in Persian). Vol. 2. Tehran: Markaz-e Pazhuheshi-ye Mirath-e Maktub.
- Gheissari, Ali (1988). "Bahādor Jang, Amir". Encyclopædia Iranica. Vol. III. pp. 437–438.
