= Sun Throne =

Imperial throne of Iran

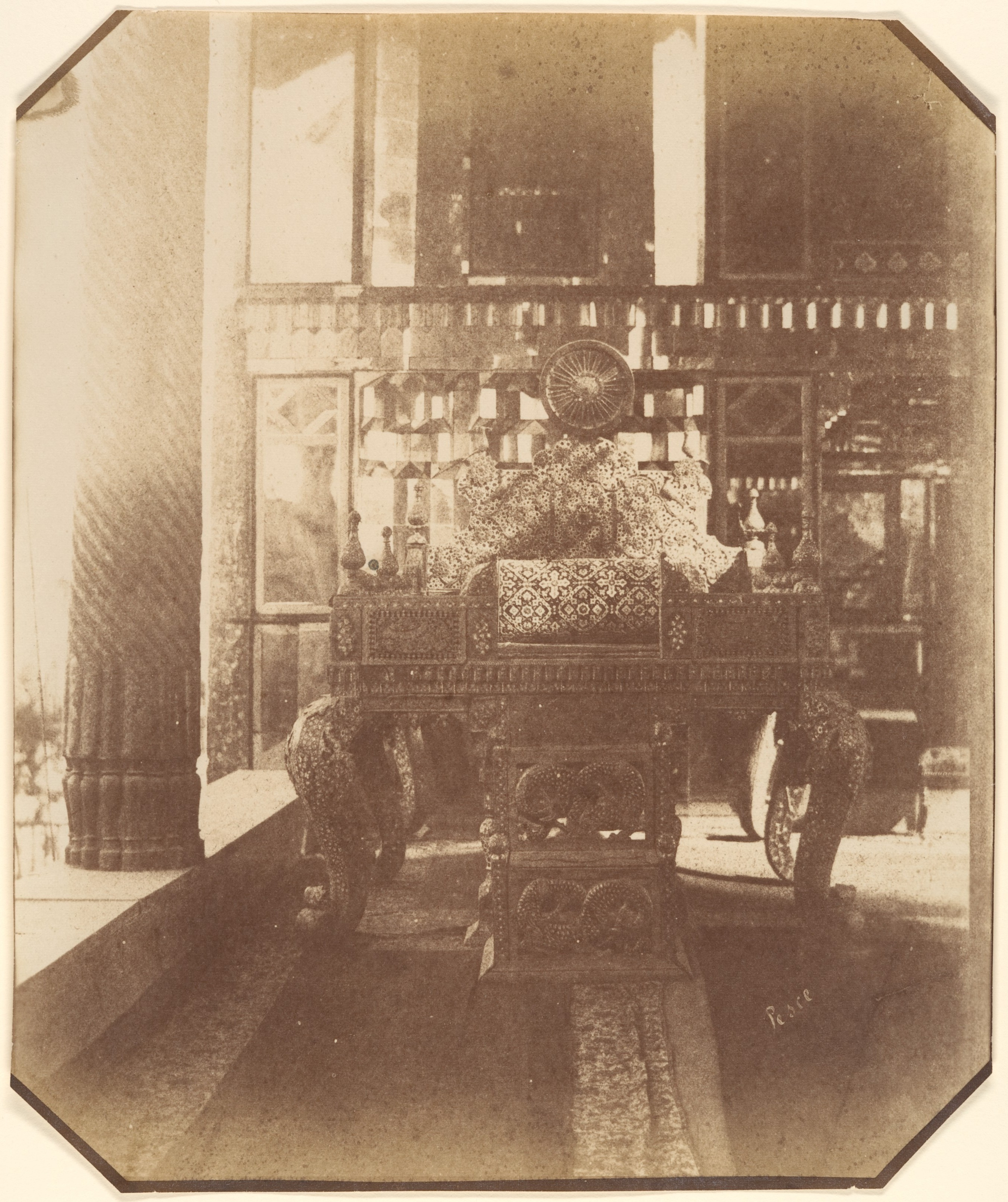
Photograph of the Sun Throne by Luigi Pesce, 1840s–60s

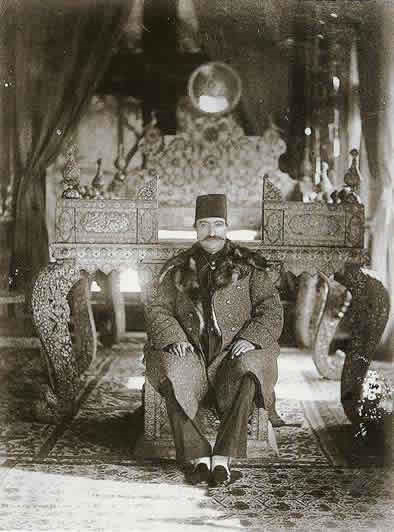
Naser al-Din Shah seated on the steps of the Sun Throne in the Mirror Hall of Golestan Palace

The Sun Throne (Persian: تخت خورشید, romanized: Takht-e Khorshīd), also known as the Peacock Throne (Persian: تخت طاووس, romanized: Takht-e Tāvūs), is a Qajar era Imperial throne of Iran. A radiant sun disk on its headboard and Tavus Khanum, a consort of Fath-Ali Shah Qajar, give the throne each of its names respectively. The throne has the shape of a platform, similar to the Marble Throne in Golestan Palace. The Naderi Throne was constructed later and has the appearance of a chair. Since 1980, it has been displayed at the Central Bank of Iran as part of the Iranian National Jewels.

== History ==
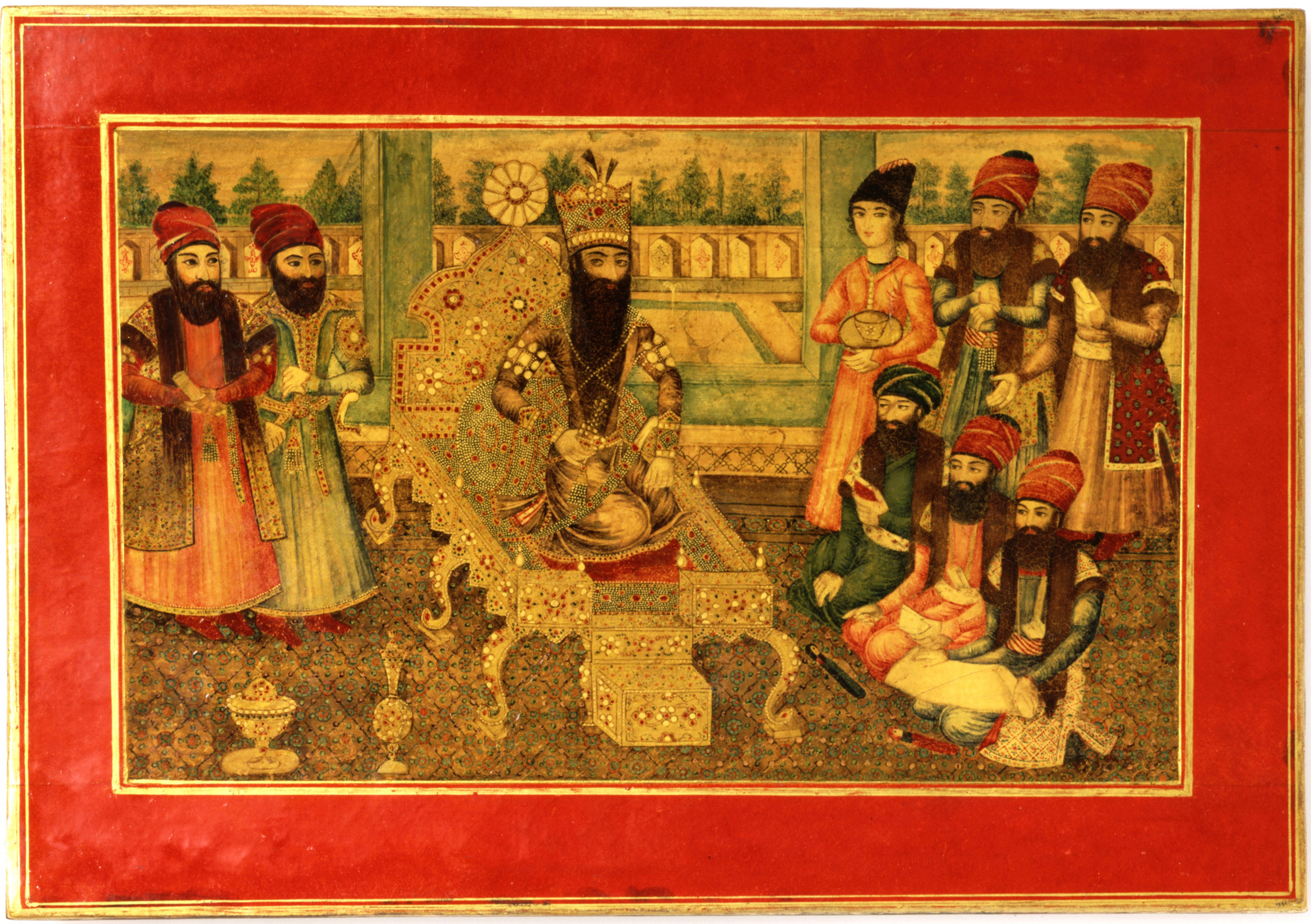
Fath-Ali Shah Qajar on the Sun Throne, c. 1835

It was constructed for Fath-Ali Shah Qajar in the early 19th century and was used as the coronation throne thereafter. He took Tavus Khanum (lit. 'Lady Peacock') as one of his consorts. The marriage ceremony took place on the throne, and Tavus Khanum became his favourite wife. Owing to her name, the throne later received the name "Peacock Throne". It was also theorised that parts of the plundered Mughal Peacock Throne were re-used, such as the legs or other parts; however, no conclusive proof exists.

Not a single element on the Sun Throne features a peacock. The Lion and Sun was the ancient symbol of kingship in Iran. When the Shah would be seated on the throne, he symbolised the lion, with the sun symbol behind his back. The Shah himself, however, could also be seen as the sun. The last Shah, Mohammad Reza Pahlavi, carried the title Aryamehr (lit. 'Light of the Aryans'), which was another connotation for the sun.

Until 1980, the Sun Throne was located in the Mirror Hall of Golestan Palace. In 1980, it was decided to move it to the vaults of the Iranian Crown Jewels at Iran's Central Bank where it is now on display.

== Gallery ==
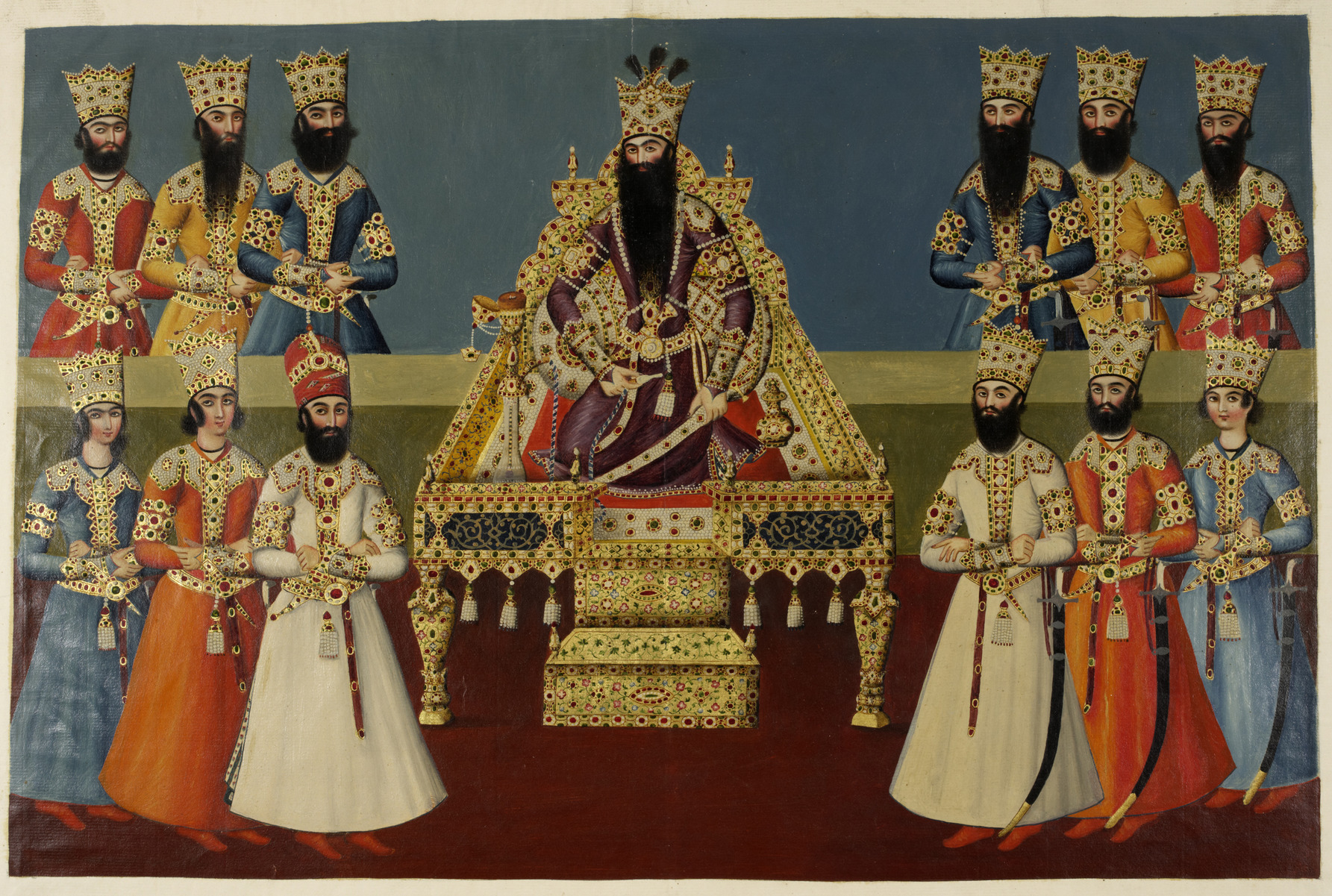
Fath-Ali Shah Qajar on the Sun Throne, by Abdallah Khan, 1816–20

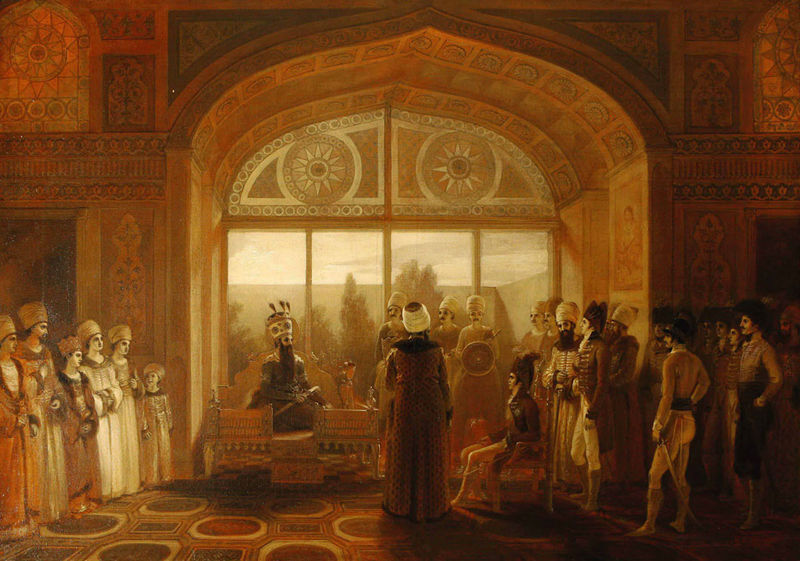
Fath-Ali Shah on the Sun Throne granting an audience to Sir Harford Jones, by Robert Smirke, 1809–1810

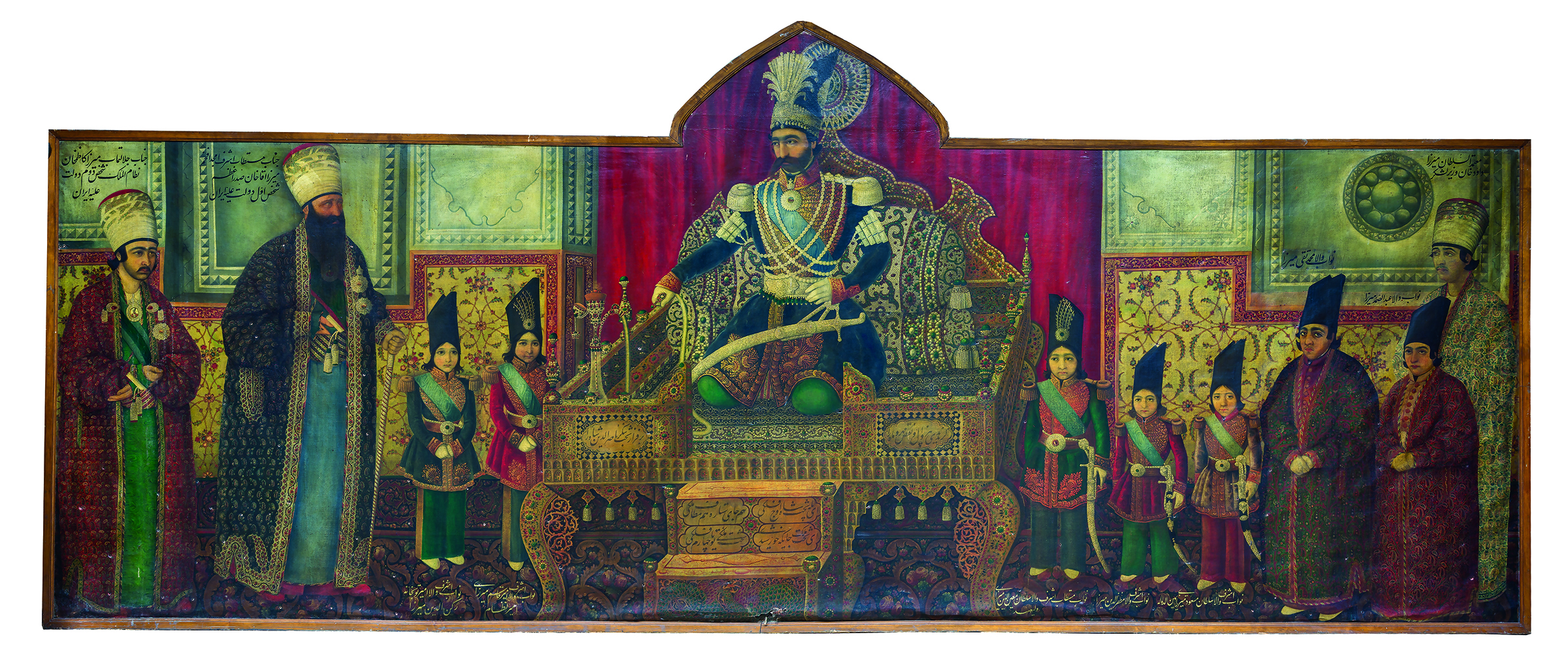
Naser al-Din Shah Qajar on the Sun Throne, by Abu'l-Hasan Sani al-Mulk, 1856/57

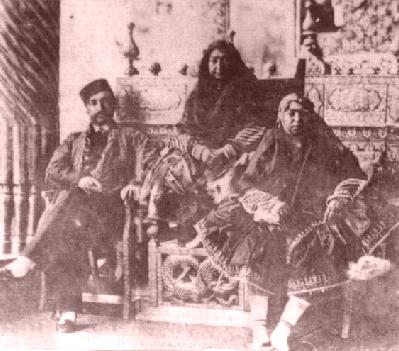
Queen mother Malek Jahan Khanom sitting on the steps of the throne. Naser al-Din Shah (left) and Princess Ezzat ed-Dowleh (right) sit on chairs beside her. Pre 1873.

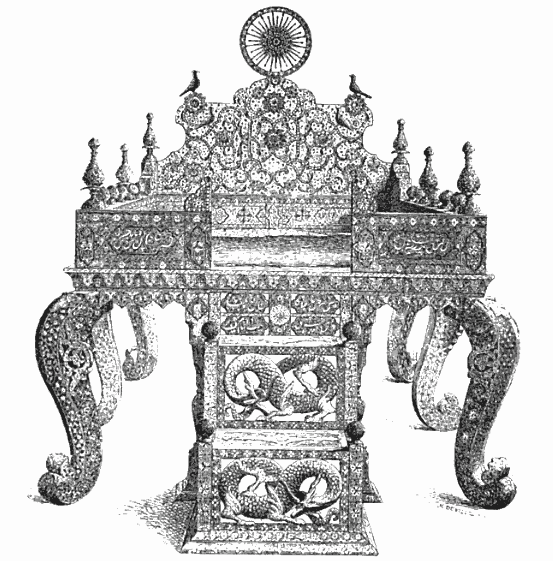
Drawing of the Sun Throne, 1892

== See also ==
- Mirror Hall (painting of the homonymous hall of The Golestan, by Kamal-ol-molk)
