= Yusef Khan-e Gorji =

Iranian military leader (died 1824)

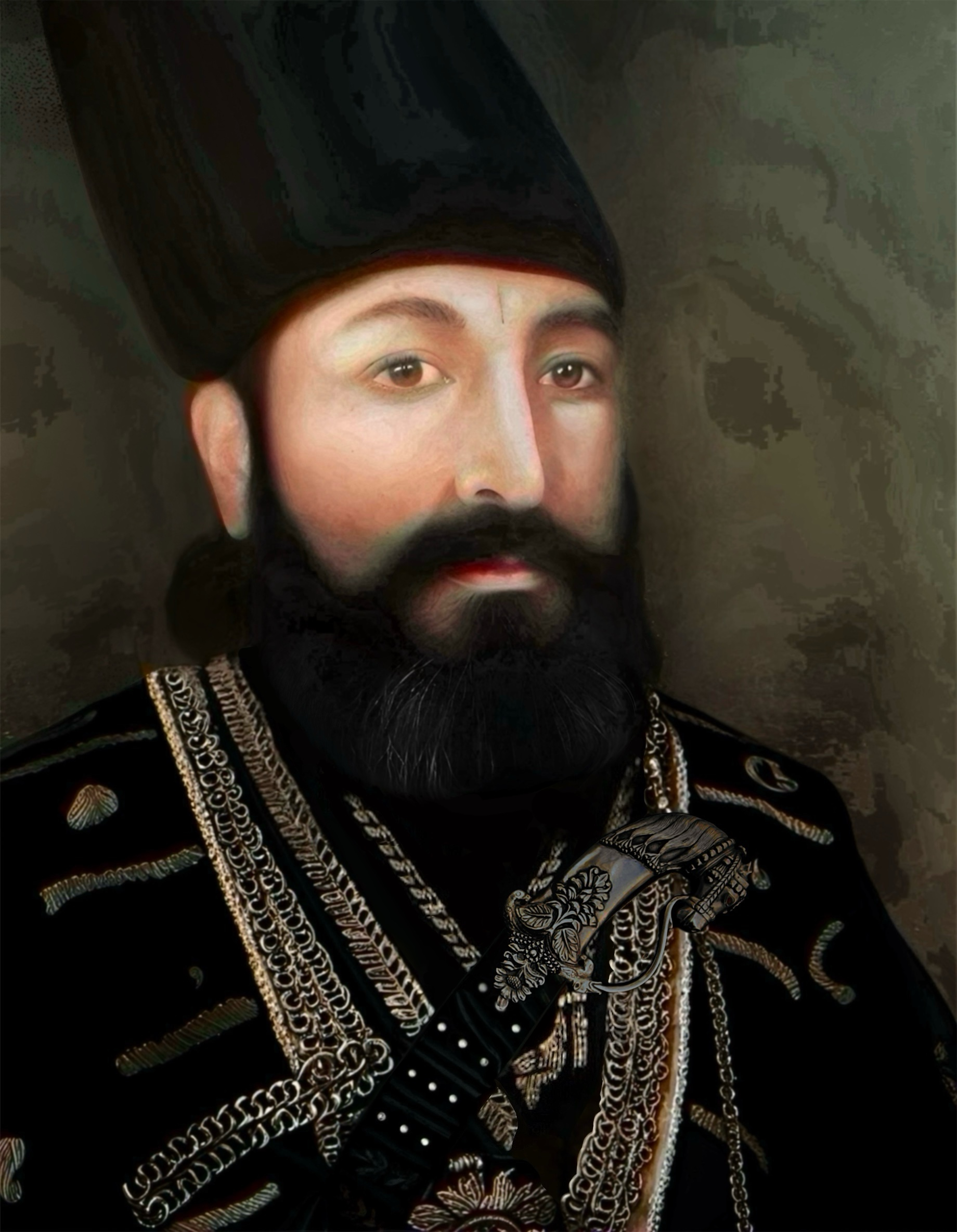
Yusef Khan e Gorji was the founder of the city of Arak and an influential military leader during the Qajar dynasty.

Yusef Khan-e Gorji (also spelled Yūsof; Persian: یوسف خان گرجی; died 1824) was a Qajar Iranian military leader and official of Georgian origin. Born in Tbilisi, An influential figure, he founded the Iranian city of Arak.

== Biography ==
Yusof Khan Gorji was given refuge by the Iranian king Agha Mohammad Khan Qajar (r. 1742–1797) following a territorial dispute with his cousins who were supported by Imperial Russian Empress Catherine the Great. In the period between 1795 and 1797, Yusef Khan-e Gorji, renamed Yusef Khan-e Sepahdar by the king, settled his army in the fertile though poorly controlled territory that would become modern Arak. Hostile tribes in this region had operated autonomously from Qajar rule. With the Iranian king Fat'h Ali Shah Qajar's approval, Yusef Khan diverted the main river to drive out the hostiles and built the Soltan Abad fortress, or Baladeh, a war fortress to serve as the foundation of what would become modern Arak. Yusef Khan's organized military force was established in this region aptly named (or more accurately, renamed) "Persian Iraq" (ʿEraq-e Ajam) (عراق عجم) from ancient times meaning 'smooth land'. According to historians, Yusef Khan built Arak from his own personal income and with the aid of affluents. Some time before 1824, he was appointed by the same aforementioned Qajar ruler Fath-Ali Shah Qajar as the personal vizier of the latter's son, Sayf ol-Dowleh. Upon his death in 1824, he was succeeded on this post by Khosrow Khan Gorji.

== See also ==
- Iranian Georgians
- Markazi province
- Arak

== Sources ==
- de Planhol, X. (1986). "ARĀK". Encyclopaedia Iranica, Vol. II, Fasc. 3. pp. 247–248.
- Maeda, Hirotake (2009). "ḴOSROW KHAN GORJI QĀJĀR". Encyclopaedia Iranica.
- Mirzai, Behnaz A. (2017). A History of Slavery and Emancipation in Iran, 1800-1929. University of Texas Press. p. 108. ISBN 978-1477311868.
