= Khosrow Khan Gorji =

Governor of Gilan
- In office 23 February 1815 – 1819
- Monarch: Fath-Ali Shah Qajar

Governor of Isfahan
- In office ? – Probably 1847
- Monarch: Mohammad Shah Qajar

Governor of Kurdistan
- In office 22 October 1847 – 1848
- Monarch: Mohammad Shah Qajar
- Preceded by: Rezaqoli Khan Wali

Governor of Qazvin
- In office 1851/2 – 27 July 1857
- Monarch: Naser al-Din Shah Qajar
- Deputy: Unnamed

Personal details
- Born: 1785/6 Tbilisi, Georgia
- Died: 24 July 1857 (aged 71–72) Tehran, Qajar Iran

Military service
- Allegiance: Russian Empire (until 1804); Qajar Iran (after 1804)
- Battles/wars: Russo-Persian War; Siege of Erivan (1804)

Andre Ghaytmazeants, better known as Khosrow Khan Gorji (Persian: خسرو خان گرجی; b. Tbilisi, 1785/6 – d. Tehran, 1857), was a eunuch of Armenian origin, who became an influential figure in Qajar Iran.

== Biography ==
Born as a son of a Christian Armenian priest in Tbilisi, Georgia, Khosrow's original name was Andre Ghaytmazeants, and like his father, was a Christian, which he remained until his late-teens, where he converted to Islam and assumed the name "Khosrow Khan Gorji". Even though the surname "Gorji" in Persian usually refers to a person of ethnic Georgian origin or descent, this was not the case with Khosrow Khan. During his early life, he participated in the expedition of the Russian general Pavel Tsitsianov against Iran during the Russo-Persian War of 1804-1813, as the former was attempting to conquer Iran's northern territories. However, he was eventually captured by the Iranian army in 1804 near Yerevan, was castrated, and then became a eunuch of the Qajars.

On 23 February 1815, Khosrow was appointed as the governor of Gilan. During his governorship of the province, he ordered the establishment of many buildings, which still survive today in Gilan. He also had good relations with lower classes of the region, but had bad relations with the local rulers of the province. This soon resulted in a revolt in 1819, and Khosrow was shortly deprived of his governorship of the region by the Iranian prince Dowlatshah.

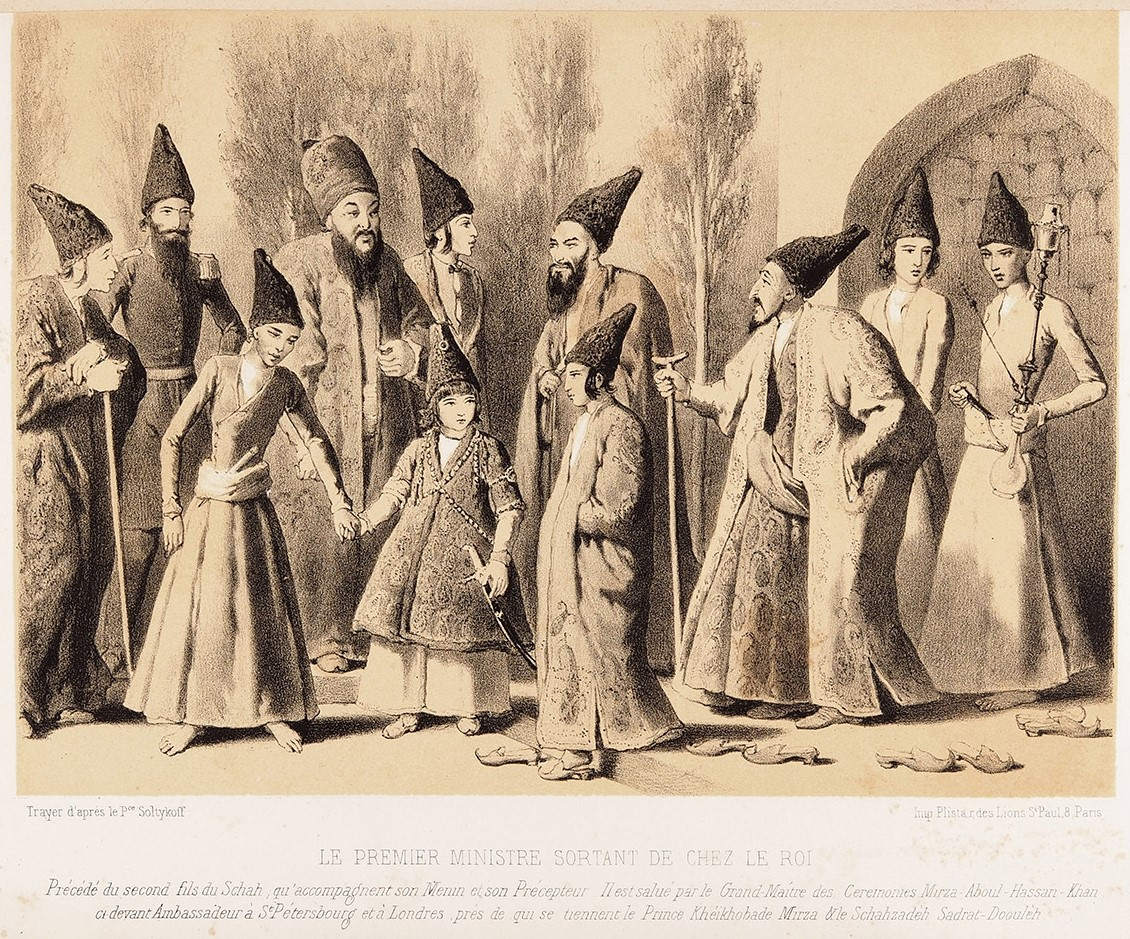
The prime minister leaving the king's house, followed by Schazahdèh Sadrat-Dooulèh and the eunuch Kosrow-Khan, and preceded by the king's second son, accompanied by his menin and his tutor. He is greeted by the great master of ceremonies Mirza-Aboul-by Hassan-Khan, former ambassador to Saint Petersburg and London, near whom stands Prince Kéikhobade-Mirzá (one of the Shah's brothers. Sketched by Alexey Saltykov in 1838.

Later in 1822/3, Khosrow was sent at the head of an army consisting of Bakhtiaris to conquer Mandali, a place situated between the Iranian-Ottoman borders. Khosrow successfully managed to conquer the place, and was in 1824, appointed by the Qajar shah Fath-Ali Shah Qajar as the personal vizier of the latter's son, Sayf ol-Dowleh, who served as the governor of Isfahan, thus succeeding the Georgian nobleman named Yusef Khan-e Gorji. Inside the royal court, Khosrow formed an alliance with Manouchehr Khan Gorji and also the crown prince Abbas Mirza.

Fath-Ali Shah later died in 1834, which resulted in a struggle for the Qajar throne between his two sons Ali Mirza and Mohammad Mirza. Khosrow aided Mohammad, who eventually managed to emerge victorious during the struggle, and crowned himself as the new shah of Iran, taking the dynastic name of "Mohammad Shah Qajar". Khosrow was then appointed as the governor of Isfahan as an award for his aid. On 22 October 1847, Khosrow was appointed as the governor of Kurdistan, thus succeeding Rezaqoli Khan Wali, whom he had arrested and sent to the Iranian capital Tehran. However, his governorship of Kurdistan was brief, and lasted only one year, the same year which Mohammad Shah died.

In 1851/2 Khosrow was appointed as the governor of Qazvin, but instead sent a representative to the province, and stayed during the rest of his life in the capital Tehran, where he died on 27 July 1857.

== Sources ==
- Maeda, Hirotake (2009). "ḴOSROW KHAN GORJI QĀJĀR". In Yarshater, Ehsan (ed.). Encyclopædia Iranica (Online ed.). Encyclopædia Iranica Foundation.
