= Soltan-Ahmad Mirza Azod od-Dowleh =

Qajar prince and official (1824–1902)

Soltan-Ahmad Mirza
- Azod od-Dowleh
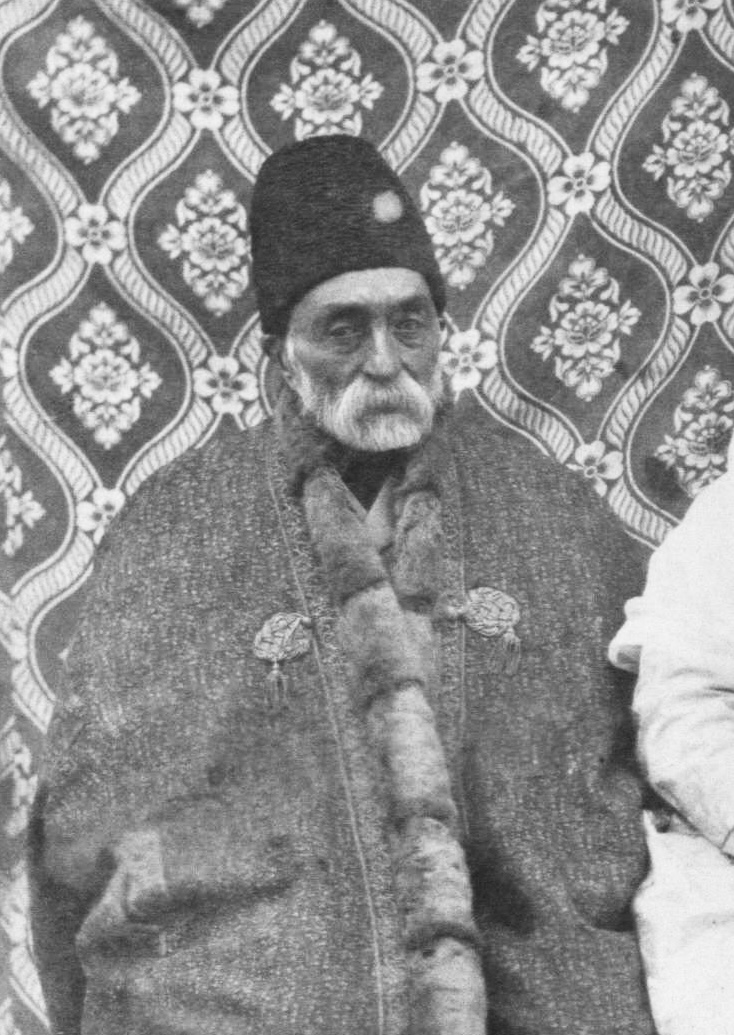
- Azod od-Dowleh (cropped), Photograph with his daughter Shams al-Dawla wife of Naser al-Din Shah Qajar and Prince Jahansuz Mirza Amirnoyan.
- Born: 16 July 1824; Tehran, Iran
- Died: 1902 (aged 77–78); Tehran, Iran
- Issue: Abdol Majid Mirza; Abdol Mohammad Mirza Seyf od-Dowleh; Vajihollah Mirza Sepahsalar; Shams od-Dowleh
- Dynasty: Qajar
- Father: Fath-Ali Shah Qajar
- Mother: Taj ol-Dowleh
- Religion: Twelver Shia Islam
- Writing career
- Language: Persian
- Notable work: Tarikh-e Azodi

Soltan-Ahmad Mirza Azod od-Dowleh (Persian: سلطان احمد میرزا عضدالدوله; 16 July 1824 – 1902) was a Qajar prince and official in 19th-century Iran, who is known for composing the memoir Tarikh-e Azodi. He was the 49th son of the shah (king) Fath-Ali Shah Qajar (r. 1797–1834). His mother was Taj ol-Dowleh.

Azod od-Dowleh served in a number of positions of authority during his life, including as governor of Borujerd, Malayer, Tuyserkan, Hamadan, and Qazvin. He is the progenitor of the Azodi family, being survived by his three sons Abdol Majid Mirza, Abdol Mohammad Mirza Seyf od-Dowleh, Vajihollah Mirza Sepahsalar, and his daughter Shams od-Dowleh.

Azod od-Dowleh earned a reputation for having an extraordinary recollection of the life at his father's court. Because of his noteworthy storytelling skills, he was in high demand. His grandnephew, Naser al-Din Shah Qajar (r. 1848–1896), noticed this and asked Azod od-Dowleh, via Mohammad Hasan Khan E'temad os-Saltaneh, to record these short stories for future generations. In response, Azod od-Dowleh had his secretary start writing the Tarikh-e Azodi in 1886.

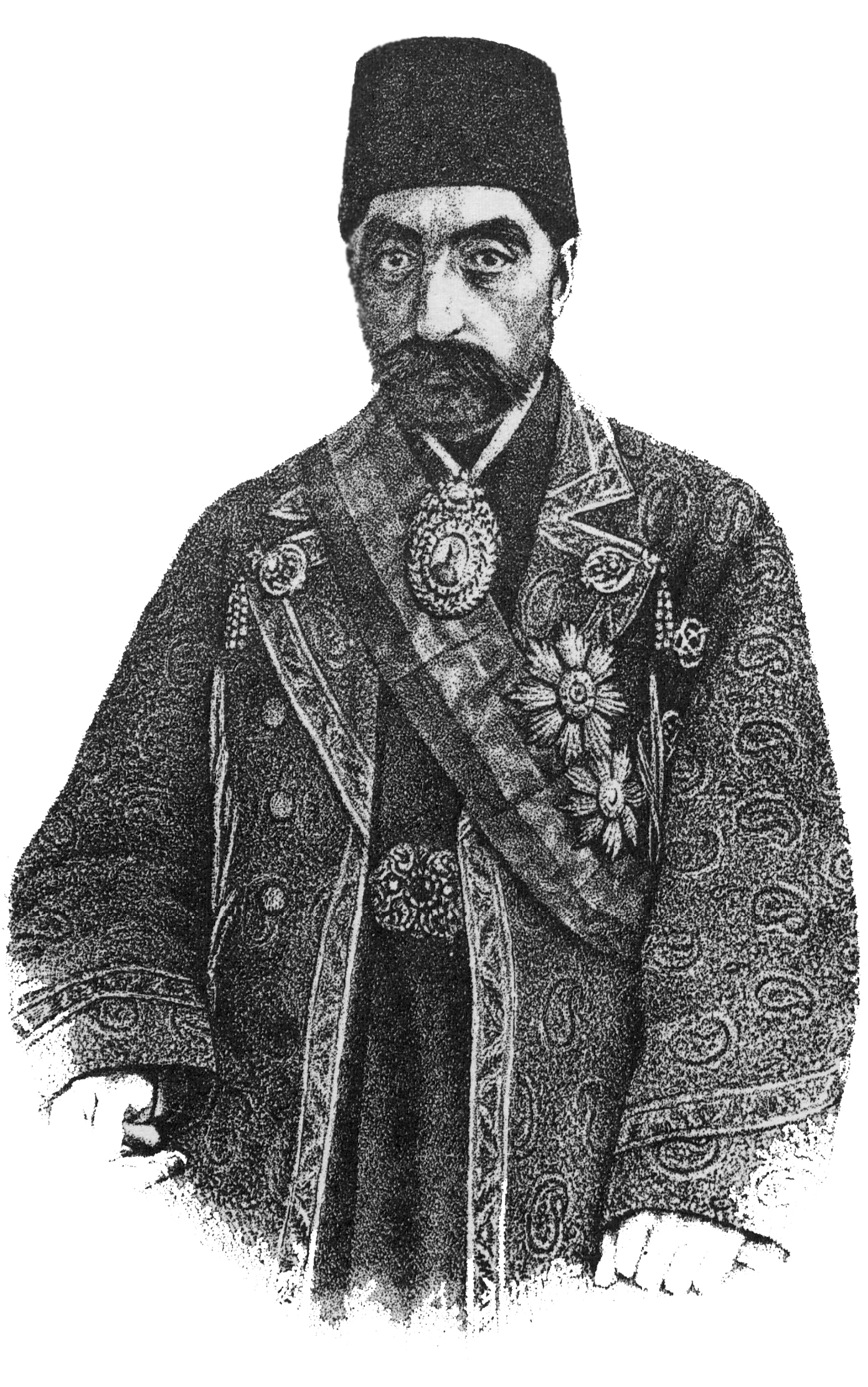
Portrait of Azod od-Dowleh by Abu Torab Ghaffari, 1884

Despite covering the history of three Qajar shahs, Azod od-Dowleh's story mostly centers on life in Fath-Ali Shah's court; yet, the latter is not the main character in the Tarikh-e Azodi. He is the center of attention for an extensive number of individuals, beginning with several of his well-known wives. The focus on the women of the court, who are given the opportunity to shine and make striking and magnificent figures, makes the Tarikh-e Azodi unique. In this way, the memoir refutes widely held beliefs that depict women as submissive figures meant to fit into the patriarchal and dominant religious systems of the era.

== Sources ==
- Eskandari-Qajar, Manoutchehr M. (2021). "ʿAżod-al-Dawla, Solṭān-Aḥmad Mirzā". In Yarshater, Ehsan (ed.). Encyclopædia Iranica (Online ed.). Encyclopædia Iranica Foundation.
