= Seyyed Mosque (Isfahan) =

Twelver Shi'ite mosque in Isfahan, Iran

- مسجد سید
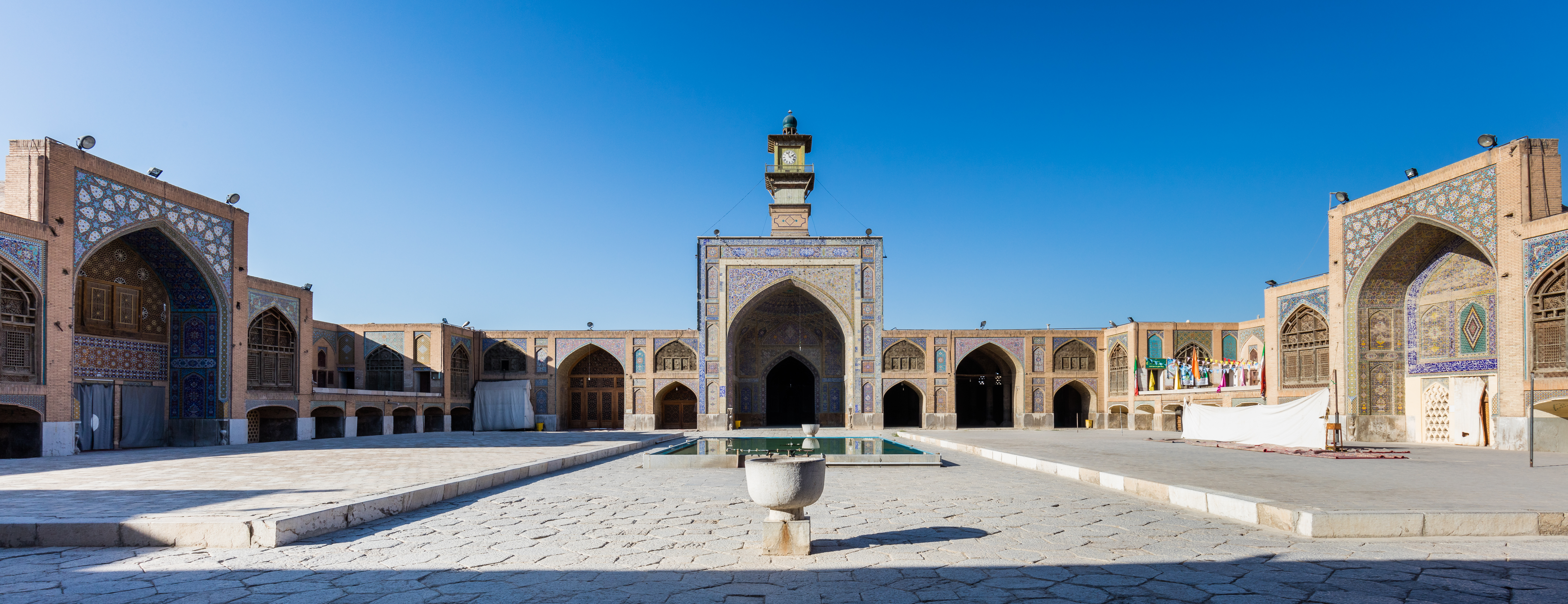
- A view of the mosque from the yard outside

- Location of the mosque in Iran

Religion
- Affiliation: Shia (Twelver)
- Ecclesiastical or organisational status: Mosque and madrasa
- Status: Partially complete; Active for worship

Location
- Location: Isfahan, Isfahan province
- Country: Iran
- Coordinates: 32°39′53″N 51°39′50″E

Architecture
- Type: Mosque architecture
- Style: Qajar style
- Founder: Mohammad Bagher Shafti
- Groundbreaking: 1825 CE
- Completed: incomplete

Specifications
- Dome: Two
- Spire: One (as a clocktower)
- Site area: 8,075 m^{2} (86,920 sq ft)
- Materials: Bricks, cement, concrete tiling

Iran National Heritage List
- Official name: Seyyed Mosque
- Type: Mosque
- Designated: 1958
- Reference no.: 387
- Conservation organization: Cultural Heritage, Handicrafts and Tourism Organization of Iran

The Seyyed Mosque (Persian: مسجد سید) is a Twelver Shi'ite mosque and madrasa, located in Isfahan, Isfahan province, Iran. It was built in the late 19th century, during the Qajar era, by the Shi'ite cleric Mohammad Bagher Shafti, one of the first clerics to receive the rank of Hujjatul Islam. The mosque itself is active; however, as of July 2024, its construction was incomplete, with restoration work in progress.

The mosque was added to the Iran National Heritage List on 20 June 1958, administered by the Cultural Heritage, Handicrafts and Tourism Organization of Iran, the Endowments and Charity Affairs Organization, and other organizations.

== History ==
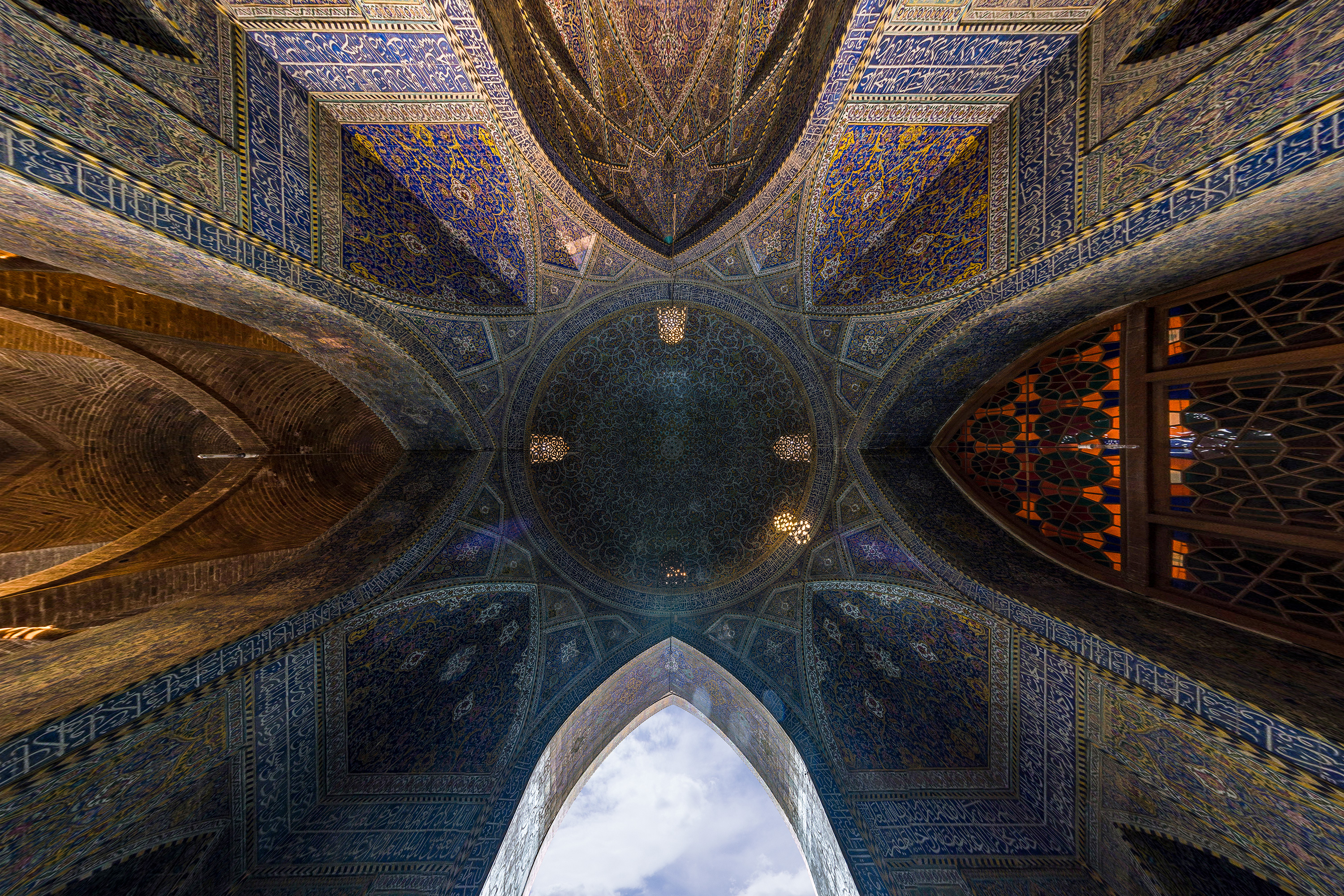
Tilework inside the large dome chamber

Construction of the mosque started in 1825 CE. It was built over an older plot of land planned for a mosque that was formerly owned by the Safavid ruler, Soltan Hoseyn, but a mosque could not be built there until the Qajar era due to the invasion of the Hotaks and the ensuing instability. After the death of Mohammad Bagher Shafti, only the tiling of the southern part of the mosque was completed. He was buried in the northeastern section of the mosque as well. The grandson of the cleric and subsequent descendants assisted in continuing the construction of the mosque. Inscriptions date the whole construction process to be around 130 years, divided into four stages. In the 1980s, the mosque was damaged during the Iran–Iraq War. It was then neglected due to disputes amongst the remaining family of Bagher Shafti. In 2023, restoration and renovation works were planned to be carried out, that had stalled by mid-2024.

== Architecture ==
The plan and base of the Seyyed Mosque is generally a rectangular shape. The mosque has two domes, the smaller, northeastern one over the mausoleum of Mohammad Bagher Shafti and his family. The mosque has four main iwans leading to it, as well as a lot of corridors within the structure. The exterior of the mosque is enhanced with Qajar-era decorative tiling.

The mosque does not have a minaret. Instead, it has a tall clock tower, located behind one of the iwans. In general, the architecture of the mosque, especially the window design is student-friendly, so that it could be used as a school or madrasah in the 19th century as well.

== Gallery ==
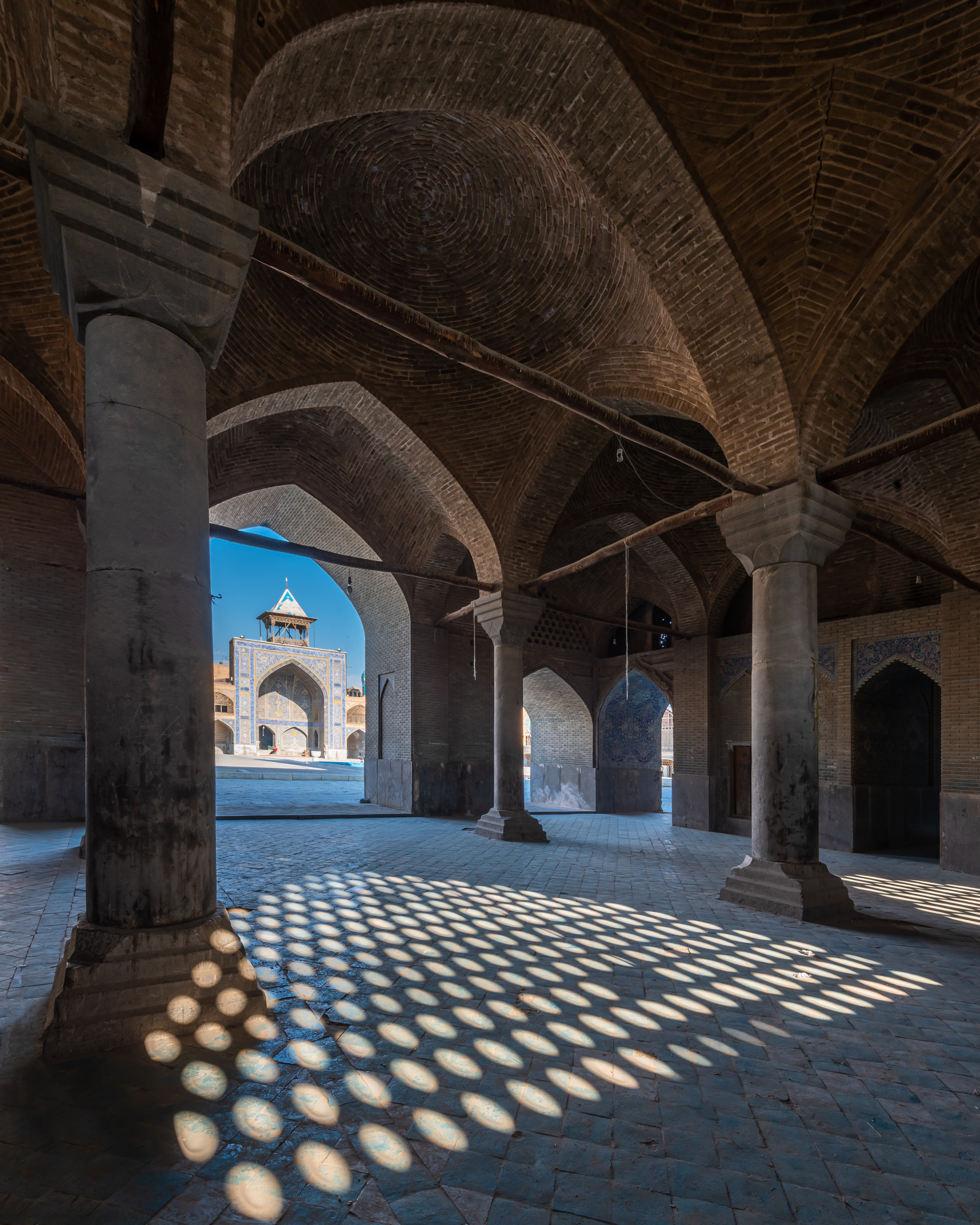
View of the courtyard from the prayer hall

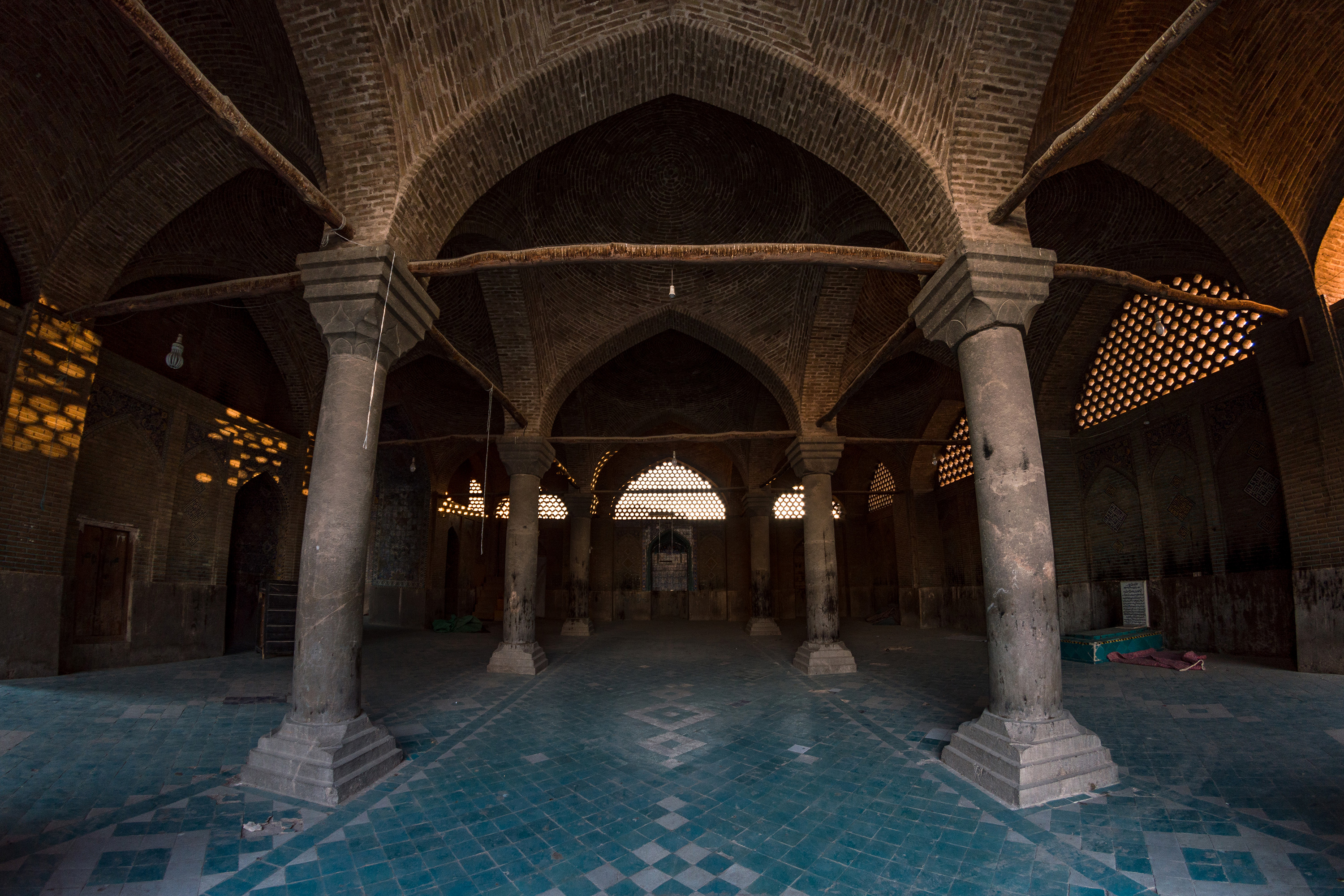
The prayer hall with its many arched columns

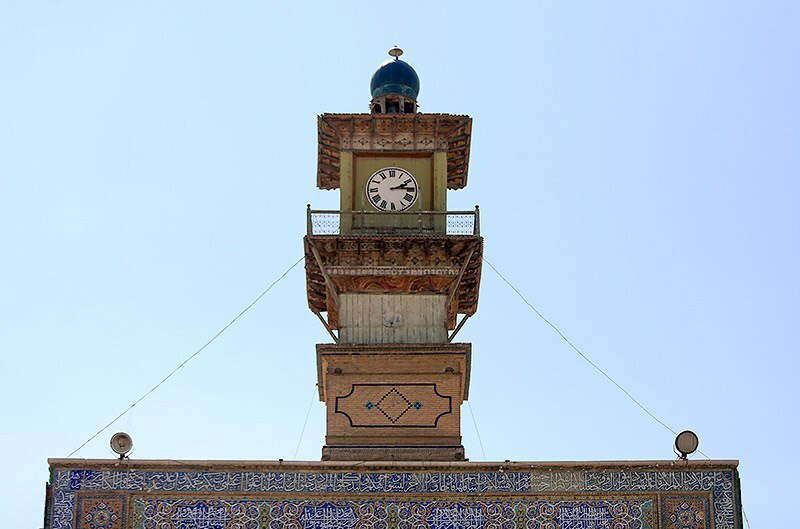
The mosque clock tower

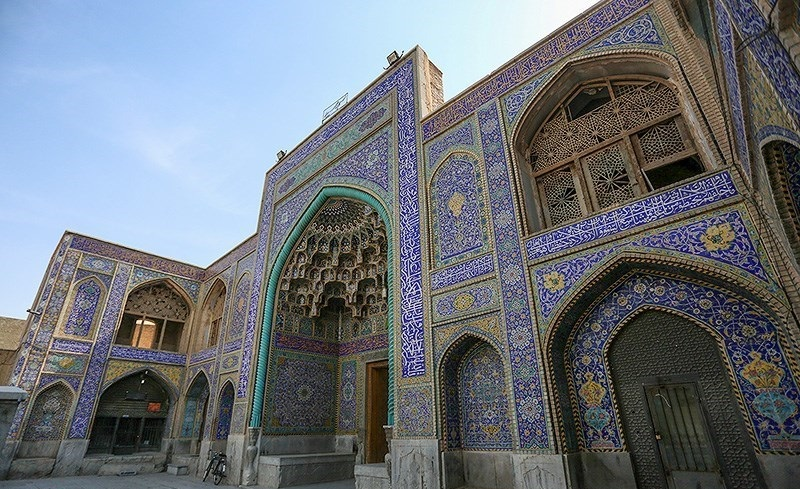
A closeup of one of the mosque iwans

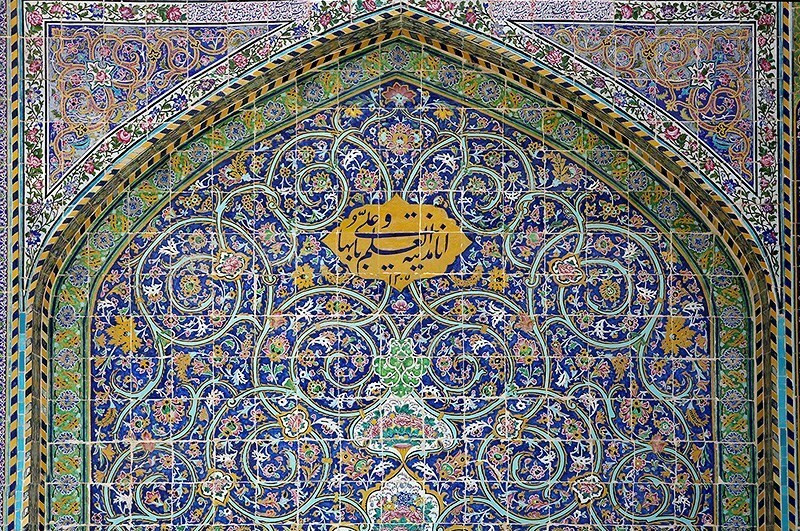
Qajar-era decorative tilework

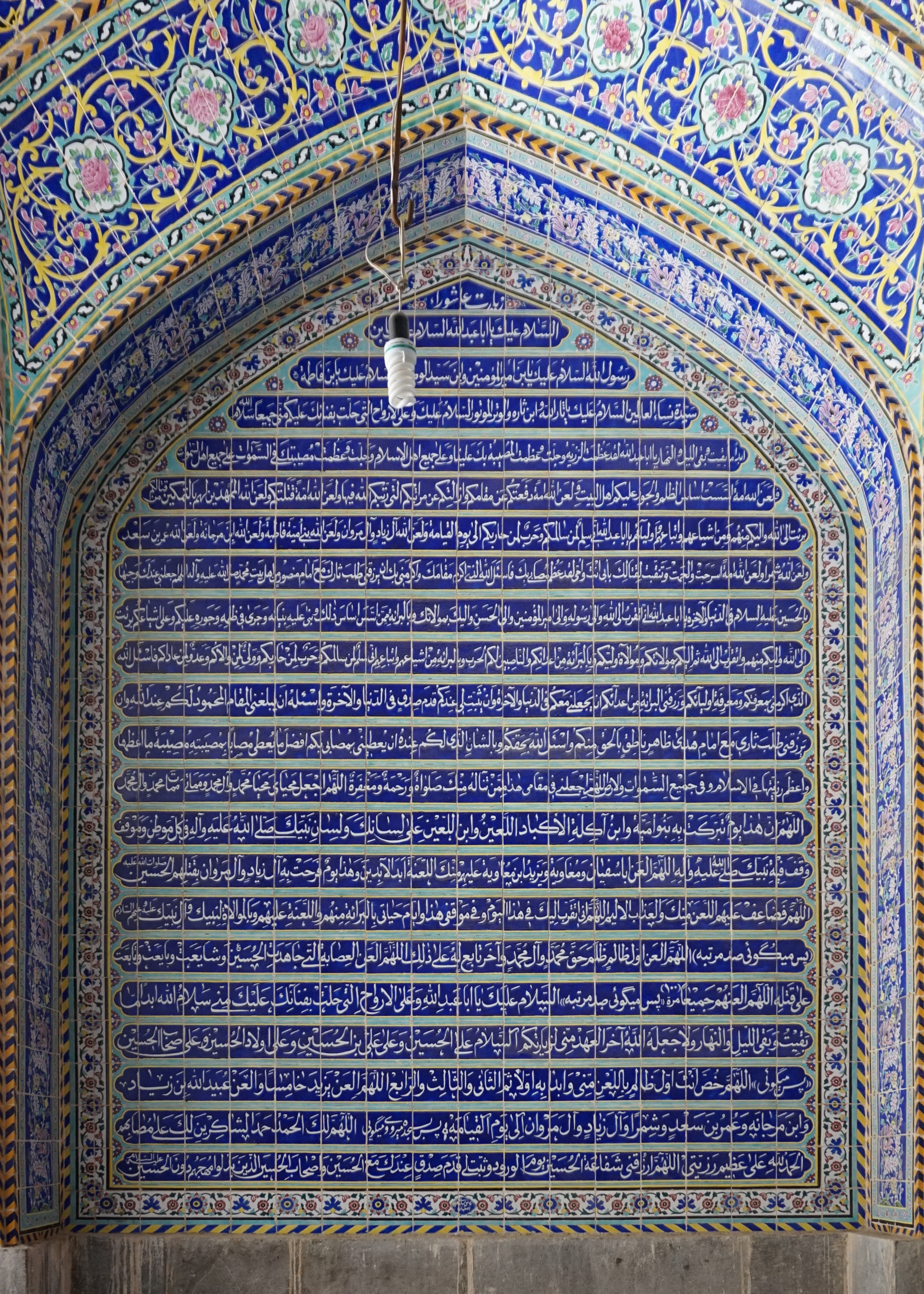
Inscription of history within the Seyyed Mosque

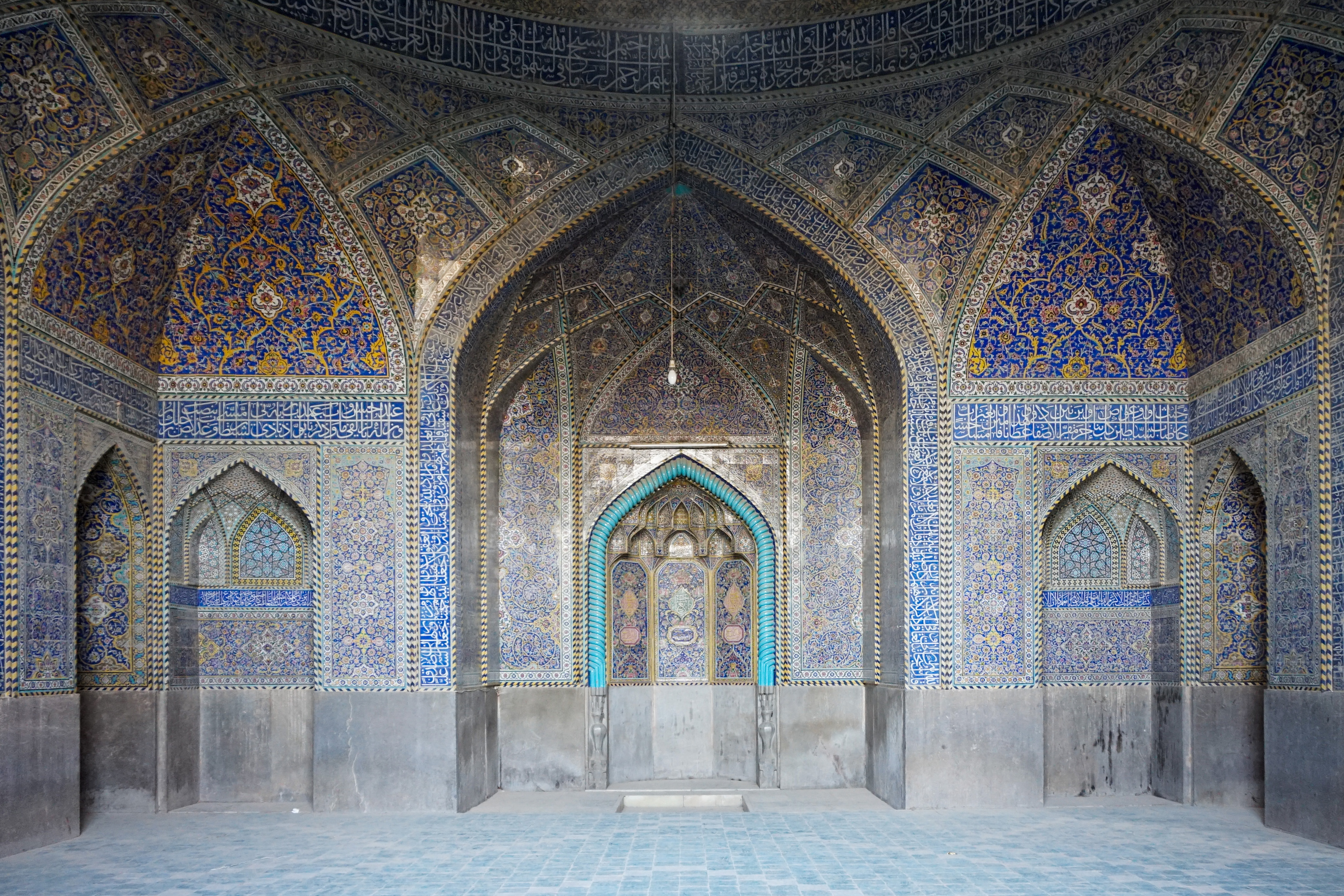
One of the musalla rooms in the mosque, with a fine mihrab preserved

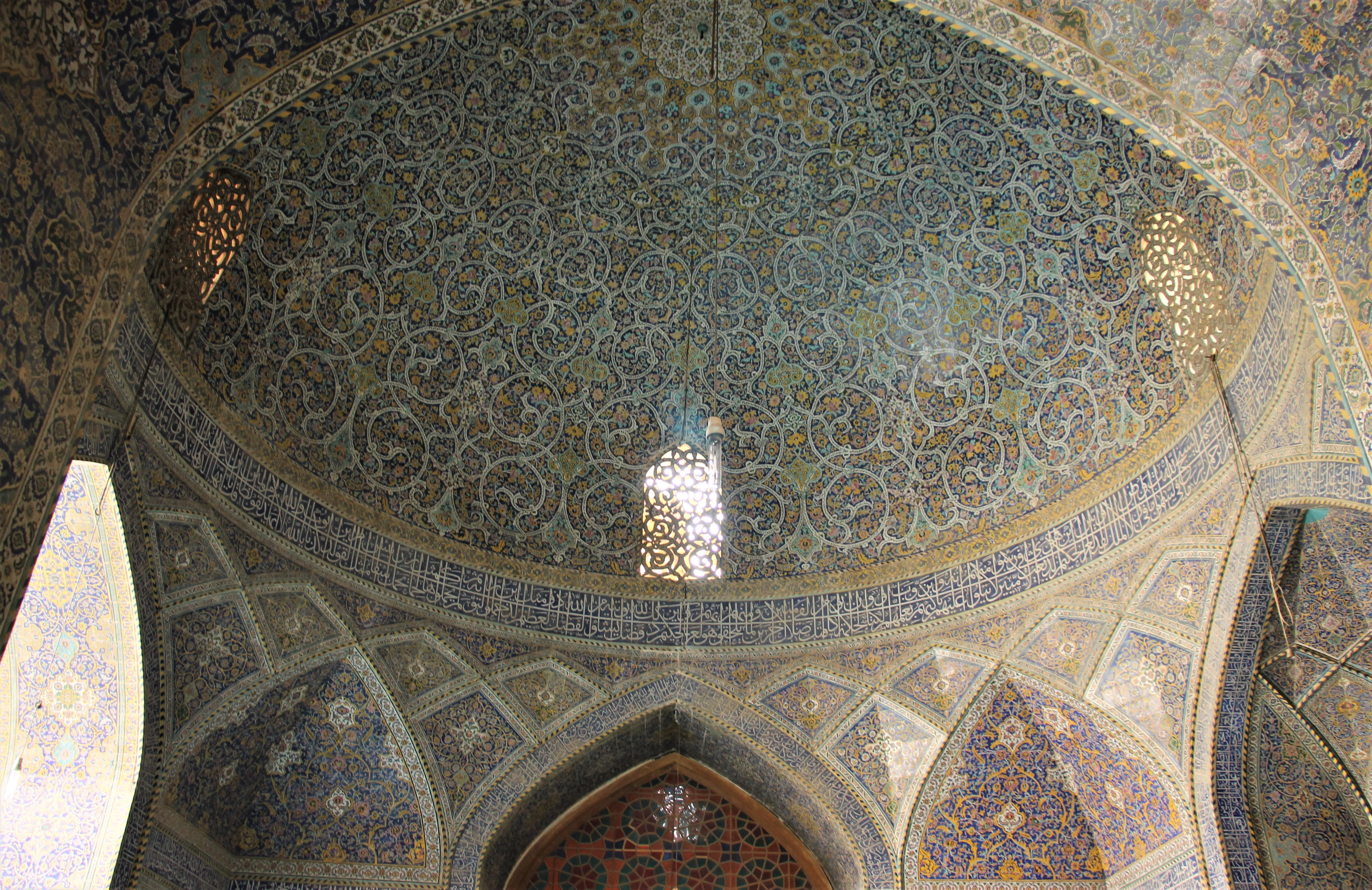
The dome

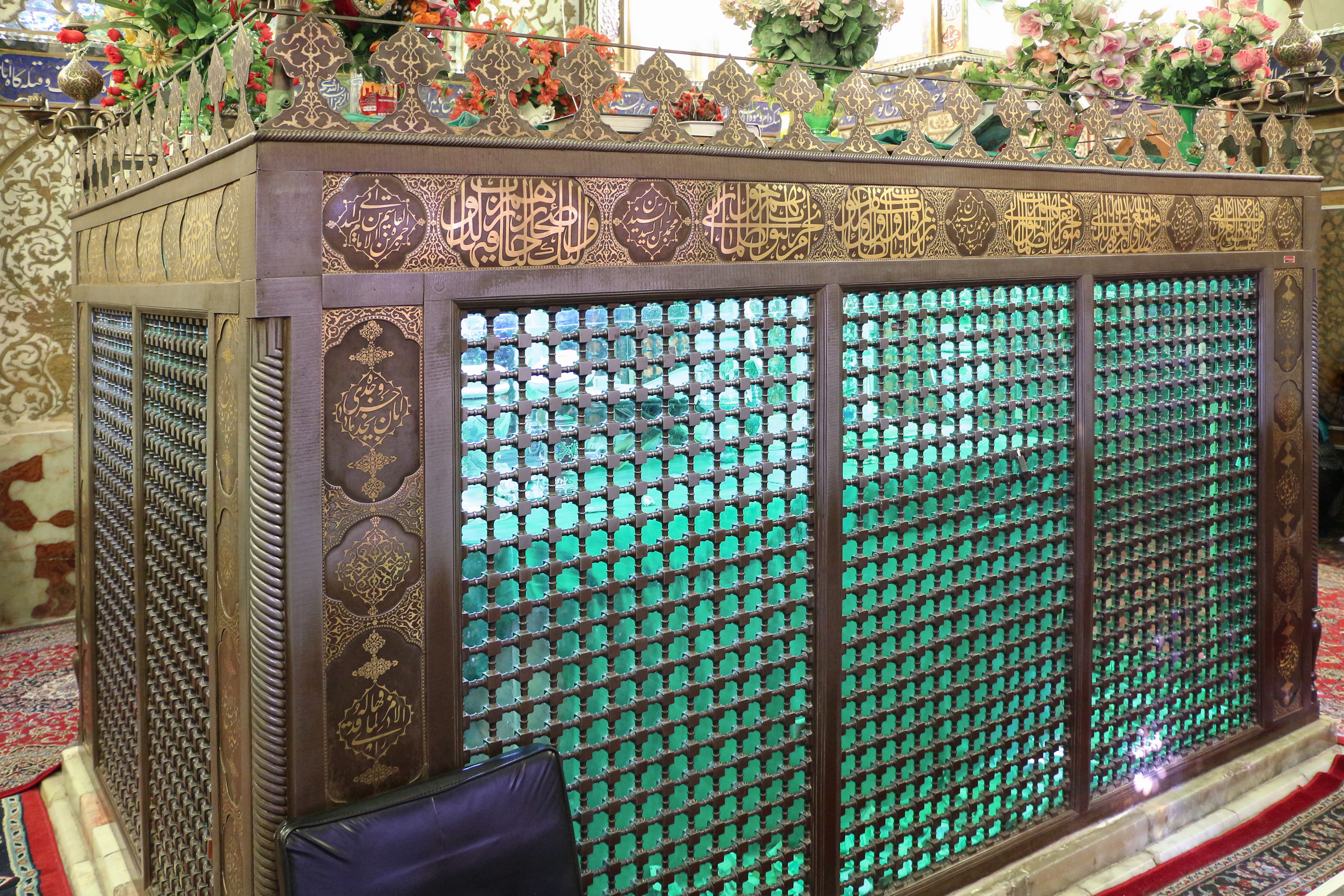
The tomb of Bagher Shafti, enclosed by a metal zarih

== See also ==
- Shia Islam in Iran
- List of mosques in Iran
- List of historical structures in Isfahan
