= Mohammad Bagher Shafti =

Iranian shia clergyman

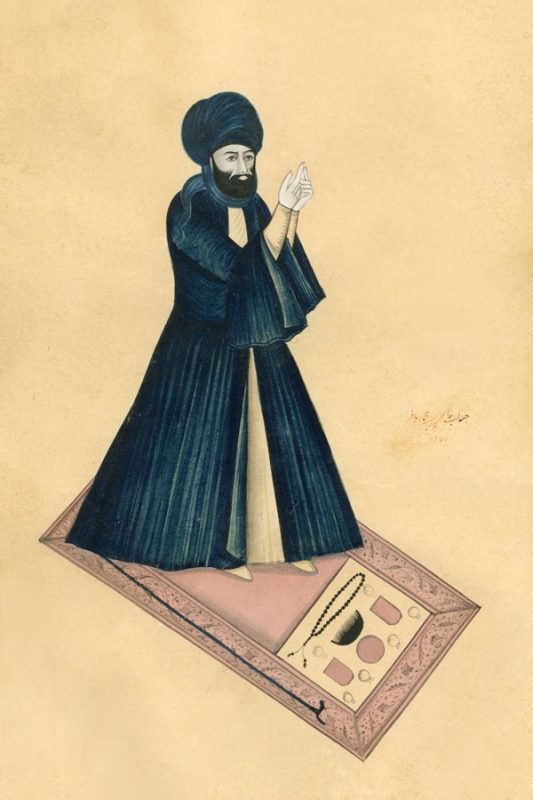
- Image of Shafti, created in Qajar Iran, dated 1843

Personal life
- Born: 1767 Shaft, Zand Iran
- Died: 1844 (aged 76–77) Isfahan, Qajar Iran

Religious life
- Religion: Islam
- Denomination: Shia
- Jurisprudence: Ja'fari
- Creed: Twelver

Mohammad Bagher Shafti (Persian: محمدباقر شفتی; 1767 in Shaft – 22 March 1844 in Isfahan), was an Iranian Twelver Shia cleric. The Seyyed mosque in Isfahan was built by him. According to Hossein Nasr and Hamid Dabashi, he is probably the first clergyman to be given the title Hojatoleslam (from Arabic: حجة الإسلام, romanized: ḥujjat al-islām). This title was bestowed upon him in recognition of his double role as both Qadi and Mufti, as well as his book about the implementation of Sharia.

== Biography ==
Shafti belonged to an impoverished family from Shaft, 15 miles south of Rasht. He had spent a significant amount of time in Iran getting a madrasa education and had attended the most relevant Karbala and Najaf teaching circles.

Shafti eventually settled in Shiraz. Despite not being a resident of the city, Shafti steadily advanced in the religious hierarchy in Isfahan, which was recovering its position as the most significant religious center in Iran. He established himself by, among other things, handing out harsh legal judgments, lashing moral offenders, destroying wine cellars and musical instruments, expelling prostitutes from the city, and fining drunkards. He also allegedly took up the task of executing around 70 people he had sentenced to death. In one instance, Shafti beheaded a pederasty suspect and then led the prayers during the body's burial. He was the leader of a well-liked teaching group, seized the management of disputed or unclaimed religious endowments (vaqf), and accumulated substantial private holdings like villages, farms, and retail malls.

At the time, Isfahan had only recently started to recover after decades of decline and depopulation. Together with a merchant from Gilan, Shafti conducted business, bought property, and amassed wealth through prudent investments and even money lending, which was against the prohibition against usury in Islam.

== Sources ==
- Amanat, Abbas (2017). Iran: A Modern History. Yale University Press. ISBN 978-0300112542.
