= Deepika Padukone filmography =

List of films with Deepika Padukone

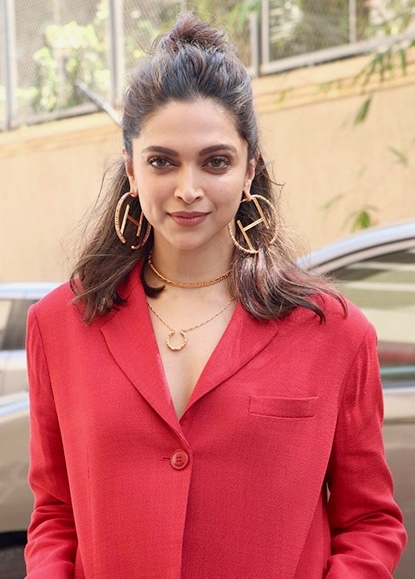
Padukone in 2019

Indian actress Deepika Padukone primarily appears in Hindi films. Her first screen appearance was in Himesh Reshammiya's music video "Naam Hai Tera" in 2005. Padukone made her film debut by playing the title role in the Kannada-language film Aishwarya (2006). Her first Hindi film release came the following year with Farah Khan's melodrama Om Shanti Om, in which she played dual roles opposite Shah Rukh Khan. She won the Filmfare Award for Best Female Debut for it. Her sole film role in 2008 was as one of Ranbir Kapoor's love interests in Bachna Ae Haseeno. Padukone's first film release of 2009, the kung fu comedy Chandni Chowk to China, proved to be a box office flop, but her next release, Imtiaz Ali's romance Love Aaj Kal, opposite Saif Ali Khan, was a success. Of Padukone's five film releases in 2010, only the comedy Housefull was financially profitable. The series of poorly received films continued with both her 2011 releases, Aarakshan and Desi Boyz.

The acclaimed role of an impulsive party-girl in Homi Adajania's Cocktail (2012) proved to be a breakthrough for Padukone. The year 2013 was key for Padukone when all four of her films were box office hits. Among these were two of the highest-grossing Indian films—the romantic comedies Yeh Jawaani Hai Deewani and Chennai Express. She also won the Filmfare Award for Best Actress for playing a character based on Juliet in Sanjay Leela Bhansali's tragic romance Goliyon Ki Raasleela Ram-Leela (2013). In 2014, Padukone appeared in the Tamil animation film Kochadaiiyaan and played a bar dancer in the top-grossing heist film Happy New Year. The following year, she played a headstrong daughter in Shoojit Sircar's comedy-drama Piku, which earned Padukone her second Best Actress award at Filmfare, and portrayed the warrior Mastani in Bhansali's top-grossing historical romance Bajirao Mastani.

Padukone's first project in Hollywood—the action film XXX: Return of Xander Cage (2017)—earned over US$345 million worldwide. In 2018, she reunited with Bhansali in another top-grossing period film, Padmaavat, in which she portrayed the title role of Rani Padmavati. After a small break from acting, she starred in Chhapaak (2020) and 83 (2021), both produced under her own company Ka Productions, but they were not financially profitable. In 2023, Padukone reunited with Shah Rukh Khan in the action films Pathaan and Jawan. Both earned over ₹10 billion (US$100 million) to emerge as her highest-grossing Indian releases. The following year, she starred in the action film Fighter and the science fiction film Kalki 2898 AD, both of which were among the year's top-grossing Indian films.

== Films ==
Key
†	Denotes films that have not yet been released

- All films are in Hindi unless otherwise noted.

Year	Title	Role(s)	Notes	Ref.
2006	Aishwarya	Aishwarya Pai	Kannada film	
2007	Om Shanti Om	Shantipriya / Sandhya "Sandy" (Note: Padukone played dual roles in the film.)		
2008	Bachna Ae Haseeno	Gayatri Jakhar		
2009	Chandni Chowk to China	Sakhi Godbole / Suzy		
2009	Billu	Herself	Special appearance in the song "Love Mera Hit Hit"	
2009	Love Aaj Kal	Meera Pandit		
2009	Main Aurr Mrs Khanna	Raina Khan	Cameo appearance	
2010	Karthik Calling Karthik	Shonali Mukherjee		
2010	Housefull	Saundarya "Sandy" Rao		
2010	Lafangey Parindey	Pinky Palkar		
2010	Break Ke Baad	Aaliyah Khan		
2010	Khelein Hum Jee Jaan Sey	Kalpana Datta		
2011	Dum Maaro Dum	Herself	Special appearance in the song "Dum Maro Dum"	
2011	Aarakshan	Purvi Anand		
2011	Desi Boyz	Radhika Awasthi		
2012	Cocktail	Veronica Malaney		
2013	Race 2	Alina Malik		
2013	Bombay Talkies	Herself	Special appearance in the song "Apna Bombay Talkies"	
2013	Yeh Jawaani Hai Deewani	Naina Talwar		
2013	Chennai Express	Meenalochni "Meenamma" Azhagusundaram		
2013	Goliyon Ki Raasleela Ram-Leela	Leela Sanera		
2014	Kochadaiiyaan	Vadhana Devi	Tamil film	
2014	Finding Fanny	Angelina "Angie" Eucharistica	English film	
2014	Happy New Year	Mohini Joshi		
2015	My Choice	Herself	English short film	
2015	Piku	Piku Banerjee		
2015	Tamasha	Tara Maheshwari		
2015	Bajirao Mastani	Mastani		
2017	XXX: Return of Xander Cage	Serena Unger	American film	
2017	Raabta	Herself	Special appearance in the song "Raabta"	
2018	Padmaavat	Rani Padmavati		
2018	Zero	Herself	Cameo appearance	
2020	Chhapaak	Malti Agarwal	Also producer	
2021	83	Romi Dev	Also producer	
2022	Gehraiyaan	Alisha Khanna		
2022	Brahmāstra: Part One – Shiva	Amrita	Uncredited cameo appearance	
2022	Cirkus	Vrindama	Special appearance in the song "Current Laga Re"	
2023	Pathaan	Dr. Rubina "Rubai" Mohsin		
2023	Jawan	Aishwarya Rathore	Partially reshot in Tamil	
2024	Fighter	Squadron Leader Minal "Minni" Rathore		
2024	Kalki 2898 AD	Sumati (SUM-80)	Telugu film; partially reshot in Hindi	
2024	Singham Again	DCP Shakti Shetty		
2026	King †	TBA	Post-production	
2027	Raaka †	TBA	Telugu film; Filming	

== Music video appearances ==
List of Deepika Padukone music video appearances
Year	Title	Performer(s)	Album	Ref.
2006	"Naam Hai Tera"	Himesh Reshammiya	Aap Kaa Surroor	
2010	"Phir Mile Sur Mera Tumhara"	Various	—	
2012	"Bolydude Ganeshan"	Ganesh Hegde	Let's Party	

== See also ==
- List of awards and nominations received by Deepika Padukone
