= Deepika Padukone =

Indian actress (born 1986)

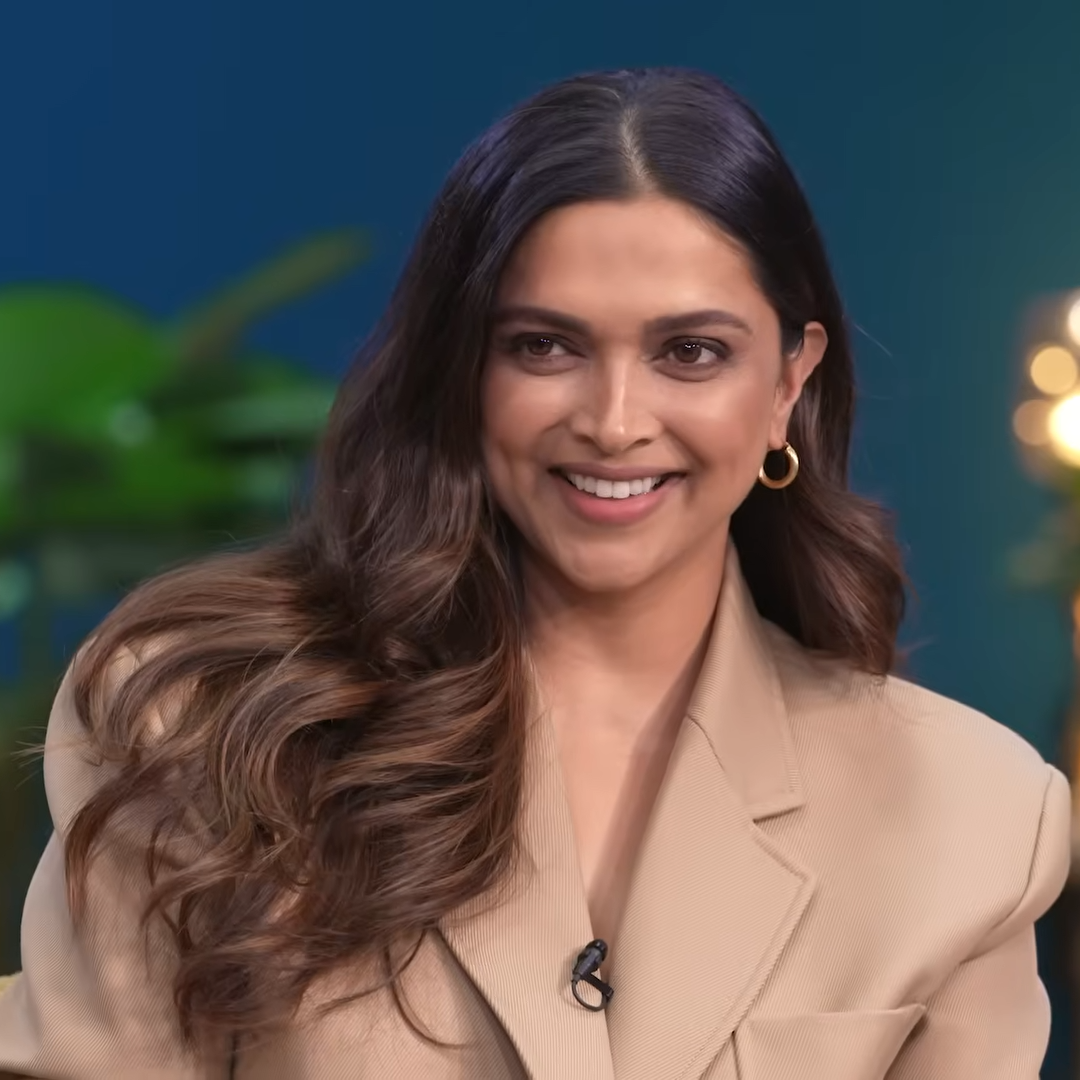
- Padukone in 2025
- Born: Deepika Prakash Padukone; 5 January 1986 (age 40); Copenhagen, Denmark
- Citizenship: India
- Occupation: Actress
- Years active: 2006–present
- Works: Full list
- Spouse: Ranveer Singh (m. 2018)
- Children: 2
- Father: Prakash Padukone
- Awards: Full list
- Website: deepikapadukone.com

Deepika Prakash Padukone (pronounced [d̪iːpɪkaː pəɖʊkoːɳeː]; born 5 January 1986) is an Indian actress who works predominantly in Hindi films. One of India's highest-paid actresses, Padukone's accolades include three Filmfare Awards. Time named her one of the 100 most influential people in the world in 2018 and awarded her the Time100 Impact Award in 2022.

Padukone, the daughter of the badminton player Prakash Padukone, was born in Copenhagen and raised in Bangalore. As a teenager, she played badminton in national level championships but left her career in the sport to become a fashion model. She soon received offers for film roles and made her acting debut in 2006 as the title character of the Kannada film Aishwarya. Padukone then played a dual role opposite Shah Rukh Khan in her first Bollywood release, the romance Om Shanti Om (2007), which won her the Filmfare Award for Best Female Debut. Padukone received praise for her starring role in the romance Love Aaj Kal (2009), but this was followed by a brief setback.

The romantic comedy Cocktail (2012) marked a turning point in her career, and she gained further success with starring roles in the romantic comedies Yeh Jawaani Hai Deewani and Chennai Express (both 2013), the heist comedy Happy New Year (2014), Sanjay Leela Bhansali's period dramas Bajirao Mastani (2015) and Padmaavat (2018), and the Hollywood action film XXX: Return of Xander Cage (2017). She also received critical acclaim for playing a character based on Juliet in Bhansali's Goliyon Ki Raasleela Ram-Leela (2013) and a headstrong daughter in Piku (2015), winning two Filmfare Awards for Best Actress. Following a short hiatus and producing two films under her own company Ka Productions, Padukone took on roles in top-grossing action films, including Pathaan (2023), Fighter and Kalki 2898 AD (both 2024).

Padukone is the founder of The Live Love Laugh Foundation, which creates awareness on mental health in India, for which she received the World Economic Forum's Crystal Award in 2018. She also participates in stage shows, has designed her own line of clothing for women, and is a prominent celebrity endorser for brands and products. Padukone has walked the Met Gala red carpet in Manhattan thrice: in 2017, 2018, and 2019. Her other ventures include startup investments and a self-care brand. Padukone is married to her frequent co-star Ranveer Singh, with whom she has two daughters.

== Early life and modelling career ==
Deepika Prakash Padukone was born on 5 January 1986 in Copenhagen, Denmark, to Konkani-speaking Indian parents. Her father, Prakash Padukone, is a former professional badminton player and her mother, Ujjala, is a travel agent. Her younger sister, Anisha, is a golfer. Her paternal grandfather, Ramesh, was a secretary of the Mysore Badminton Association. The family relocated to Bangalore, India when Padukone was a year old. She was educated at Bangalore's Sophia High School and completed her pre-university education at Mount Carmel College. She subsequently enrolled at the Indira Gandhi National Open University for a Bachelor of Arts degree in sociology, but dropped out due to scheduling conflicts with her modelling career.

Padukone has said that she was socially awkward as a child and did not have many friends. The focus of her life was badminton, which she played competitively from a young age. Describing her daily routine in a 2012 interview, Padukone said, "I would wake up at five in the morning, go for physical training, go to school, again go for playing badminton, finish my homework, and go to sleep." Padukone continued to pursue a career in badminton throughout her school years and played the sport in national level championships. She also played baseball in a few state level tournaments. While concentrating on her education and sporting career, Padukone also worked as a child model, first appearing in a couple of advertising campaigns at the age of eight. In the tenth grade, she changed focus and decided to become a fashion model. She later explained, "I realised that I was playing the game only because it ran in the family. So, I asked my father if I could give up the game and he wasn't upset at all." In 2004, she began a full-time career as a model under the tutelage of Prasad Bidapa.

Early in her career, Padukone gained recognition with a television commercial for the soap Liril and modelled for various other brands and products. In 2005, she made her runway debut at the Lakmé Fashion Week for designer Suneet Varma and won Model of the Year at the Kingfisher Fashion Awards. Padukone's fame increased when she appeared in a popular print campaign for the 2006 Kingfisher Calendar; the designer Wendell Rodricks commented, "Since Aishwarya Rai, we haven't had a girl as beautiful and fresh." Rodricks had spotted her at a Ganjam jewellery class he was teaching and signed her up with the Matrix talent agency. At the age of 21, Padukone relocated to Mumbai and stayed at her aunt's home. In 2006, she gained recognition by featuring in the music video for Himesh Reshammiya's song "Naam Hai Tera" for the album Aap Ka Surroor.

Padukone soon began to receive offers for film roles. Believing herself to be too inexperienced as an actor, she enrolled for a course at Anupam Kher's film academy. Following much media speculation, the director Farah Khan, who had noticed her in Reshammiya's music video, made the decision to cast her for a role in her upcoming film, then named Happy New Year. Rodricks also takes credit in helping her get the role. Khan was looking for a model to star in the film, and got in touch with Malaika Arora. Rodricks, for whom Padukone had been modelling for roughly two years then, recommended her to Arora, a close friend of his, who in turn recommended her to Khan.

== Acting career ==
=== Film breakthrough and career struggles (2006–2011) ===
Padukone made her acting debut with Aishwarya (2006), a Kannada film directed by Indrajit Lankesh. The romantic comedy was a remake of the Telugu film Manmadhudu, and she was cast in the title role opposite the actor Upendra. The film proved to be a commercial success. R. G. Vijayasarathy of Rediff.com was appreciative of Padukone's screen presence but added that "she needs to work on her emotional scenes." By the end of 2006, Farah Khan's Happy New Year was shelved, and Khan had instead cast Padukone for the masala film Om Shanti Om (2007). Set against the backdrop of the Hindi film industry, the film tells the story of a struggling actor who is reincarnated to avenge the death of a film star. Shah Rukh Khan starred as the lead, and Padukone featured in dual roles of a star in the 1970s, and later, an aspiring actress. In preparation, Padukone watched several films of actresses Helen and Hema Malini to study their body language. Her voice was dubbed by the voice artist Mona Ghosh Shetty. For one of the songs in the film, "Dhoom Taana", Padukone drew upon Indian classical dance, and according to Dorling Kindersley, "mesmeriz[ed] audiences" by using hasta mudras (hand gestures). Om Shanti Om emerged as the highest-grossing Hindi film of the year, with a global revenue of ₹1.49 billion (US$16 million). Taran Adarsh of the entertainment portal Bollywood Hungama opined that she had "all it takes to be a top star", and she was awarded with the Filmfare Best Female Debut Award and received her first Filmfare Award for Best Actress nomination. Bollywood Hungama reported that the success of Om Shanti Om proved a breakthrough for her.

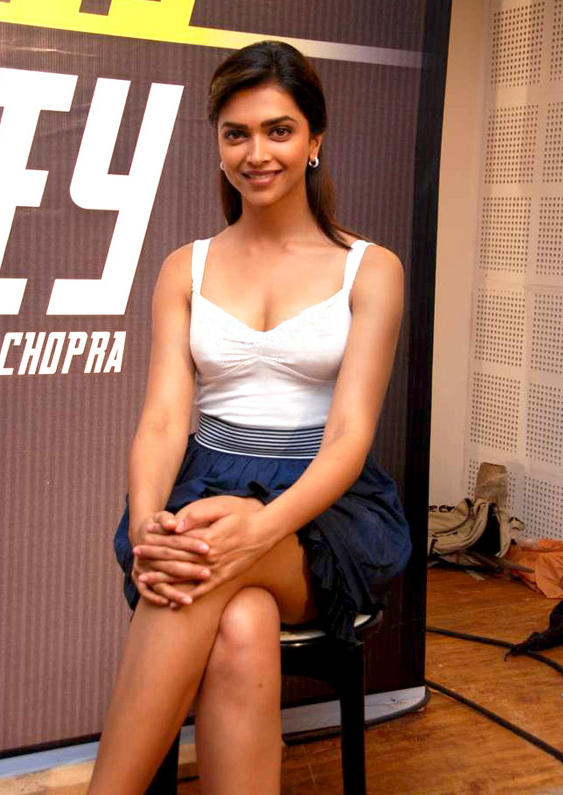
Padukone at a promotional event for Lafangey Parindey in 2010

Padukone next played one of star Ranbir Kapoor's love interests in Siddharth Anand's romantic comedy Bachna Ae Haseeno (2008). The film was a financial success, but Namrata Joshi of Outlook dismissed her performance as "mannequin-like and utterly lack[ing] fire and zing". Her first release of 2009 came alongside Akshay Kumar in the kung fu comedy Chandni Chowk to China, in which she portrayed dual roles of Indian-Chinese twin sisters. Produced by Warner Bros., it had one of the widest international releases given to an Indian film. Padukone learned jujutsu and performed her own stunts. Despite the hype, Chandni Chowk To China was a financial failure, failing to recoup its ₹800 million (US$8.5 million) budget. She appeared alongside Saif Ali Khan in the romantic drama Love Aaj Kal from the writer-director Imtiaz Ali. The film documented the changing value of relationships among the youth and had Padukone play the part of Meera Pandit, a head-strong career woman. With a worldwide gross of ₹1.2 billion (US$13 million), Love Aaj Kal proved to be the third highest-grossing Hindi film of 2009. Aniruddha Guha of Daily News and Analysis said that Padukone "delivers the best of her four performances so far", and she was awarded with another Best Actress nomination at Filmfare.

Padukone had five film releases in 2010. In the psychological thriller Karthik Calling Karthik, she played the supportive girlfriend of a depressed man (played by Farhan Akhtar). Derek Elley of Variety found the film to be "thinly plotted" but considered "the uncomplicated ingenuousness of Padukone" to be the film's highlight. Her most financially profitable film that year was Sajid Khan's ₹1.15 billion (US$12 million)-grossing comedy film Housefull in which she featured alongside an ensemble cast headlined by Akshay Kumar. Critic Raja Sen described the film as a "festival of bad acting" and attributed Padukone's poor performance to her "plasticky expressions". Pradeep Sarkar's drama Lafangey Parindey (2010) starred Padukone as a blind girl determined to win a skating competition, for which she observed the interactions of blind people and rehearsed scenes while blindfolded. The Hindu's Sudhish Kamath was impressed by the "considerable restraint" in her performance. Her next role was opposite Imran Khan in the romantic comedy Break Ke Baad. CNN-IBN's Rajeev Masand found the film to be "watchable largely for the performance of its leading lady". Padukone's final release of 2010 was Ashutosh Gowariker's period film Khelein Hum Jee Jaan Sey opposite Abhishek Bachchan. Based on the book Do and Die, the film is a retelling of the 1930 Chittagong armoury raid. Bachchan featured as the revolutionary leader Surya Sen and Padukone played Kalpana Dutta, his confidante. Padukone said that she was unable to research her role as there was very little information on Dutta and relied on Gowarikar's direction. Barring Housefull, none of these films were commercially successful.

Padukone began 2011 with an item number in the film Dum Maaro Dum. She referred to it as "the wildest song any actress has done"; the song's sexual content attracted controversy including a court case for indecency. Her next film was Prakash Jha's socio-political drama Aarakshan, which dealt with caste-based reservations in India. Trade journalists had high expectations for the film which ultimately flopped at the box office. Critical reaction was largely negative, though Pratim D. Gupta mentioned Padukone as the most "refreshing thing" about it. Her final appearance that year was in the comedy Desi Boyz alongside Kumar and John Abraham, a role that failed to propel her career forward. The series of poorly received films led critics to perceive that Padukone had "[lost] her sparkle."

=== Established actress (2012–2016) ===
Padukone has said that her starring role in the 2012 Homi Adajania-directed romantic comedy Cocktail marked a turning point in her career. Raja Sen opined that she had successfully proved to be a "stunning girl who can also act." Set in London, Cocktail tells the story of a man's relationship with two temperamentally different women—an impulsive party girl (Veronica, played by Padukone) and a submissive girl next door (Meera, played by Diana Penty). During the script narration, the producer Dinesh Vijan offered Padukone the choice of which woman to play; she decided on Veronica to expand her horizons as an actress. Portraying the role was a creative and physical challenge for her, and to achieve the physical requirements of her character she exercised extensively and followed a rigorous diet. Critics were divided in their opinion of the film, but particularly praised Padukone's performance; Devesh Sharma of Filmfare credited her as the "soul of the film" and wrote that she "excels in every scene, whether as a material girl who enjoys sex, drugs and rock and roll or as the jealousy ridden girl out to destroy herself." Cocktail earned Padukone Best Actress nominations at several award ceremonies, including Filmfare, Screen, and IIFA. The film also proved to be a box office success.

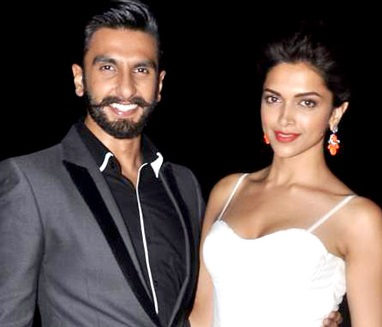
Padukone and Ranveer Singh at an event for Goliyon Ki Raasleela Ram-Leela in 2013. She was awarded her first Filmfare Award for Best Actress for her performance in the film.

The year 2013 was key for Padukone, as she starred in four of the top-grossing Hindi films of the year. She reunited with Saif Ali Khan in Abbas–Mustan's Race 2, an ensemble action thriller that served as a sequel to Race (2008). The film received predominantly negative reviews, but grossed a successful total of ₹1.62 billion (US$17 million). Ayan Mukerji's romantic comedy Yeh Jawaani Hai Deewani paired her opposite Ranbir Kapoor. She was cast as Naina Talwar, a "shy wallflower", which marked a departure from the glamorous characters that she had a reputation for portraying. Raja Sen termed it "her most self-aware performance" adding that she "acts within herself and eschews exaggeration, and the results are impressive". The pairing of Padukone with her former boyfriend was highly anticipated, and the film emerged as a major commercial success. Her next appearance was opposite Shah Rukh Khan in Rohit Shetty's action comedy film Chennai Express, as a Tamil girl on the run from her father (a local don), which required that she adopt a Tamil accent. Critical opinion on her accent was mixed, but her performance received praise; film critic Aseem Chhabra wrote, "Padukone is delightful in the film—beautiful, smiling, and often a lot more playful and funny than Khan." Chennai Express earned over ₹3.95 billion (US$42 million) to emerge as one of the highest-grossing Indian films.

Padukone next played opposite Ranveer Singh in Goliyon Ki Raasleela Ram-Leela, an adaptation of the Shakespearean tragedy of Romeo and Juliet from director Sanjay Leela Bhansali. Her role was Leela, a Gujarati girl based on the character of Juliet. Initially titled Ram-Leela, the film's title was changed after a court case was registered against Bhansali, Padukone, and Singh for "offending the religious sentiments" of the Hindu community by showcasing sex and violence under a title that referred to the life of Rama. The film released among protests, but was generally well received by critics. Meena Iyer of The Times of India mentioned Padukone as "breathtaking", and Khalid Mohamed concluded that "it's Deepika Padukone whom the film belongs to. Looking drop dead gorgeous and going at her part with a wallop, she's the prime asset of Ram-Leela." Her performances in Chennai Express and Goliyon Ki Raasleela Ram-Leela won her several awards, including the Screen Award for Best Actress for both films and the Filmfare Award for Best Actress for the latter.

In 2014, Padukone featured opposite Rajinikanth in the Tamil film Kochadaiiyaan, a period drama shot using motion capture technology. She was paid ₹30 million (US$320,000) for two days of work in it. In Homi Adajania's satire Finding Fanny, Padukone played a young widow on a road trip with her dysfunctional friends. The film was screened at the 19th Busan International Film Festival; critic Anuj Kumar of The Hindu wrote that Padukone successfully "takes off the fineries of Bollywood and you can sense the freedom from baggage in her performance". Later that year, she starred opposite Shah Rukh Khan for the third time in Farah Khan's renewal of Happy New Year. She played a bar dancer who trains a group of underachievers for a dance competition. Sanjukta Sharma of Mint found her glamorous role to be of minimal importance, but the film became one of her most successful, earning over ₹3.4 billion (US$36 million) worldwide. Padukone later remarked that production on the film was difficult for her as she suffered from depression and anxiety.

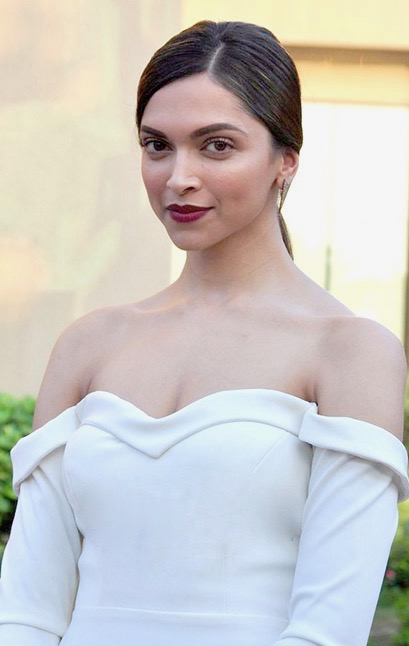
Padukone at an event for Bajirao Mastani in 2015

Following an appearance in Homi Adajania's online video on feminism, entitled My Choice, Padukone took on the role of a headstrong Bengali girl who cares for her hypochondriac father (played by Amitabh Bachchan), in Shoojit Sircar's comedy-drama Piku (2015). She was drawn to the depiction of a realistic father-daughter bond, which she thought was rare in Hindi cinema. Tanmaya Nanda of Business Standard praised the film's feminist tone, and wrote that Padukone proves "what she is capable of when given something more to do than look pretty and be the crazy-dance girl at parties". NDTV's Saibal Chatterjee opined that she "holds Piku together with a restrained star turn". With a worldwide gross of over ₹1.40 billion (US$15 million), Piku was a box office hit, and garnered Padukone several awards, including second Best Actress awards at Filmfare and Screen.

Later in 2015, Padukone played a vulnerable young woman in love with a psychologically troubled man (played by Ranbir Kapoor) in Imtiaz Ali's romantic drama Tamasha. Sukanya Verma named her performance as the best by an actress that year, writing that she "is so potent in Tamasha, it's almost as if you can hear her heartbeat across the screen". Reacting to the film's commercial failure, Padukone said that she did not measure success with box-office numbers. She reunited with Sanjay Leela Bhansali and Ranveer Singh in Bajirao Mastani, a historical drama about a tragic extramarital affair. Singh was cast as the maratha general Bajirao I, while Priyanka Chopra and Padukone featured as his first and second wife, respectively. To play the warrior-princess Mastani, Padukone learnt sword-fighting, horse-riding, and the martial art form of kalaripayattu. With a revenue of over ₹3.5 billion (US$37 million), Bajirao Mastani proved to be the fourth highest-grossing Bollywood film of the year. Anupama Chopra found Padukone "riveting", but Subhash K. Jha thought that she was "way too subtle and silken, and not steely enough". At the 61st Filmfare Awards, Bajirao Mastani was named Best Film and Padukone received her second Best Actress nomination in that year.

=== Professional expansion and fluctuations (2017–2022) ===
The action film XXX: Return of Xander Cage (2017), in which Padukone played the leading lady opposite Vin Diesel, marked her first project in Hollywood. The Philadelphia Inquirer's Tirdad Derakhshani dismissed the film as "abysmal" and thought that Padukone's talent was wasted in it, but Frank Scheck of The Hollywood Reporter believed that she "practically steals the film". The film earned over US$345 million worldwide, a majority of which came from the Chinese box office. Padukone received three nominations at the Teen Choice Awards.

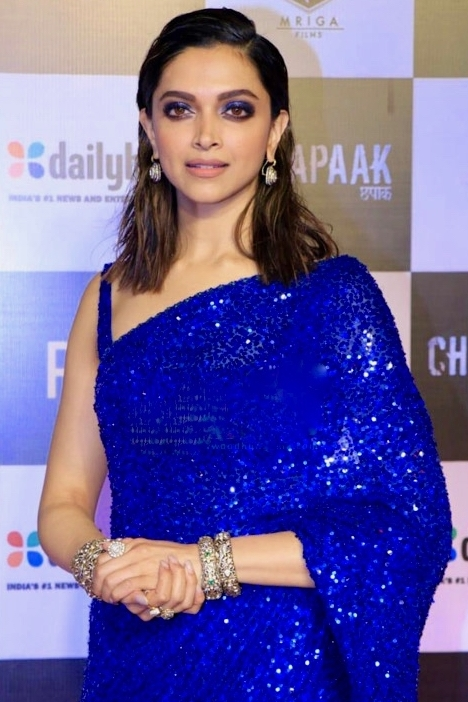
Padukone at the premiere of Chhapaak (2020), which marked her first production venture

In 2018, Padukone portrayed Rani Padmavati, a Rajput queen who commits jauhar (self-immolation) to protect herself from the Muslim invader Alauddin Khilji, in the period drama Padmaavat; it marked her third collaboration with Bhansali and Singh. She was challenged by the need to convey her character's courage through silence, and was emotionally exhausted by the experience. She read history books on the era and researched the various depictions of Padmavati. Right-wing Hindu groups speculated that the film portrayed a romantic liaison between Padmavati and Khilji; they protested violently and placed a bounty to behead Padukone and Bhansali. Following a deferment, the film was cleared for release after several modifications were made to it. Anna M. M. Vetticad of Firstpost criticised the film's glorification of jauhar, but credited Padukone for managing to "eke something out of the stereotype-ridden writing". With a then-record budget of ₹2 billion (US$21 million), Padmaavat had earnings of ₹5.45 billion (US$58 million) to emerge as one of Indian cinema's biggest grossers. She received another Best Actress nomination at Filmfare.

Following Padmaavat, Padukone took some time off work to focus on her home and family. In 2018, she formed her own company, named Ka Productions. The company's first release was Chhapaak (2020), a drama by Meghna Gulzar, in which Padukone starred as an acid attack survivor (based on Laxmi Agarwal). She found it taxing to film in extreme heat wearing prosthetic makeup on her face, and considered it to be the most physically challenging role of her career. Shubhra Gupta of The Indian Express was appreciative of Padukone for "not just putting the focus on the ravaged-skin [...] but reflecting a mix of pain, anger, resignation" and Teo Bugbee of The New York Times found her "by turns inquisitive, watchful and serene but never maudlin". She received another Best Actress nomination at Filmfare. Amidst significant political backlash due to Padukone's perceived support for the Citizenship Amendment Act protests, Chhapaak failed commercially.

Padukone's next production venture was 83 (2021), a sports drama about India's victory at the 1983 Cricket World Cup, starring Ranveer Singh as Kapil Dev, in which she also took on the role of Dev's wife, Romi. The film was delayed several times chiefly due to the COVID-19 pandemic in India. Padukone was director Kabir Khan's first choice as he considered casting a real-life couple as an onscreen pair to be a good marketing strategy. Reviews for the film were positive, with Davesh Sharma of Filmfare commending Padukone for adding glamour to her supporting part. It failed to perform well commercially. Padukone next took on a leading role in Shakun Batra's Gehraiyaan (2022), a drama about infidelity which was released on Amazon Prime Video. She described her part of a troubled woman engaged in an affair as the most layered of her career. In a mixed review for the film, Siddhant Adlakha of IndieWire was appreciative of Padukone's "emotionally complex" performance. She served as a jury member at the 2022 Cannes Film Festival.

=== Big-budget action films (2023–present) ===
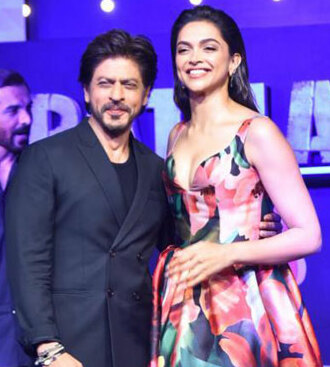
Padukone and her frequent co-star Shah Rukh Khan at an event for Pathaan in 2023

Padukone reunited with Shah Rukh Khan in Siddharth Anand's action film Pathaan (2023), set in the YRF Spy Universe. A song in the film, "Besharam Rang", featured Padukone in a saffron bikini, which became controversial once right-wing Hindutva groups deemed it obscene and objectionable. The Central Board of Film Certification cleared the film for release after some edits were made to the song sequence. Saibal Chatterjee wrote that Padukone "pulls off the dual act of an irrepressible femme fatale and a committed soldier with elan". In her second collaboration with Khan in the same year, Padukone played a brief role (billed as a special appearance) in the action thriller Jawan. Reviewers for Hindustan Times and The Week noted how much her pairing with Khan helped the picture. Both Pathaan and Jawan broke several box-office records for a Hindi film, each earning over ₹10 billion (US$110 million) to rank among Hindi cinema's biggest grossers. Padukone received another Best Actress nomination at Filmfare for Pathaan. Her accomplishments of the year led India Today to name her as "the go-to actress for big-budget spectacles". Describing her multiple collaborations with Khan, she has said that they have a "deep trust" and "a sense of ownership over each other".

Continuing her work in big-budget action films, Padukone had three such releases in 2024. Some commentators complained that her consecutive roles in such androcentric films did not give her much scope to perform. She collaborated with Anand once again in Fighter, co-starring Hrithik Roshan. For their roles as Indian Air Force officers, Roshan and Padukone were required to undergo martial arts training. WION's Shomini Sen wrote that she "looks gorgeous and shares good chemistry with Roshan—but her potential as an actress is never capitalised". Padukone then featured alongside Amitabh Bachchan and Prabhas in Kalki 2898 AD, a Telugu science fiction film from filmmaker Nag Ashwin made on a record budget of ₹6 billion (US$64 million). Set in a dystopian future, she played a pregnant test subject on the run. Sukanya Verma found her "significant even in a passive part" but Scroll.in's Nandini Ramnath opined that she "has little to do beyond looking stricken". Padukone also joined Rohit Shetty's Cop Universe franchise in the ensemble action sequel Singham Again (2024), starring Ajay Devgn in the title role. Mint's Udita Jhunjhunwala lamented her "insufficient presence" in it. Kalki 2898 AD, Singham Again and Fighter rank among the highest-grossing Indian films of 2024, with the former earning ₹10 billion (US$110 million) worldwide and the latter two having modest returns on their high production budgets. Padukone will next appear in Raaka opposite Allu Arjun and King opposite Shah Rukh Khan, in their sixth collaboration.

== Personal life ==
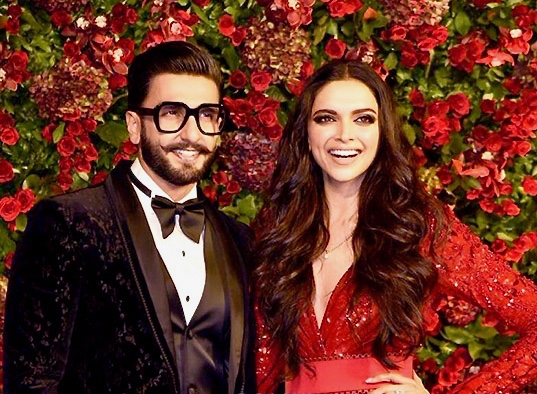
Singh and Padukone at their wedding reception in 2018

Padukone shares a close bond with her family, and visits them regularly in her hometown of Bangalore. She lives in Prabhadevi, a neighbourhood in Mumbai, and has admitted to missing the presence of her parents there. A practising Hindu, Padukone considers religion to be an important aspect of her life and makes frequent visits to temples and other religious shrines.

While filming Bachna Ae Haseeno in 2008, Padukone began a romantic relationship with co-star Ranbir Kapoor. She spoke openly about the relationship and sported a tattoo of his initials on the nape of her neck. She has said that the relationship had a profound effect on her, transforming her into a more confident and social person. The couple broke up a year later; she professed in an interview to feeling betrayed for a long time. In a 2010 interview, Padukone accused him of infidelity, and Kapoor later admitted to it. They reconciled their friendship while working on Yeh Jawaani Hai Deewani.

Padukone subsequently became reticent to discuss her personal life, but in 2017, she spoke of her relationship with her frequent co-star Ranveer Singh, whom she began dating in August 2012. In October 2018, the couple announced their impending marriage. The following month, they married in traditional Konkani Hindu and Sikh Anand Karaj ceremonies at Lake Como, Italy. On 8 September 2024, she gave birth to their first daughter. Their second daughter was born on 19 September 2026.

== Off-screen work ==
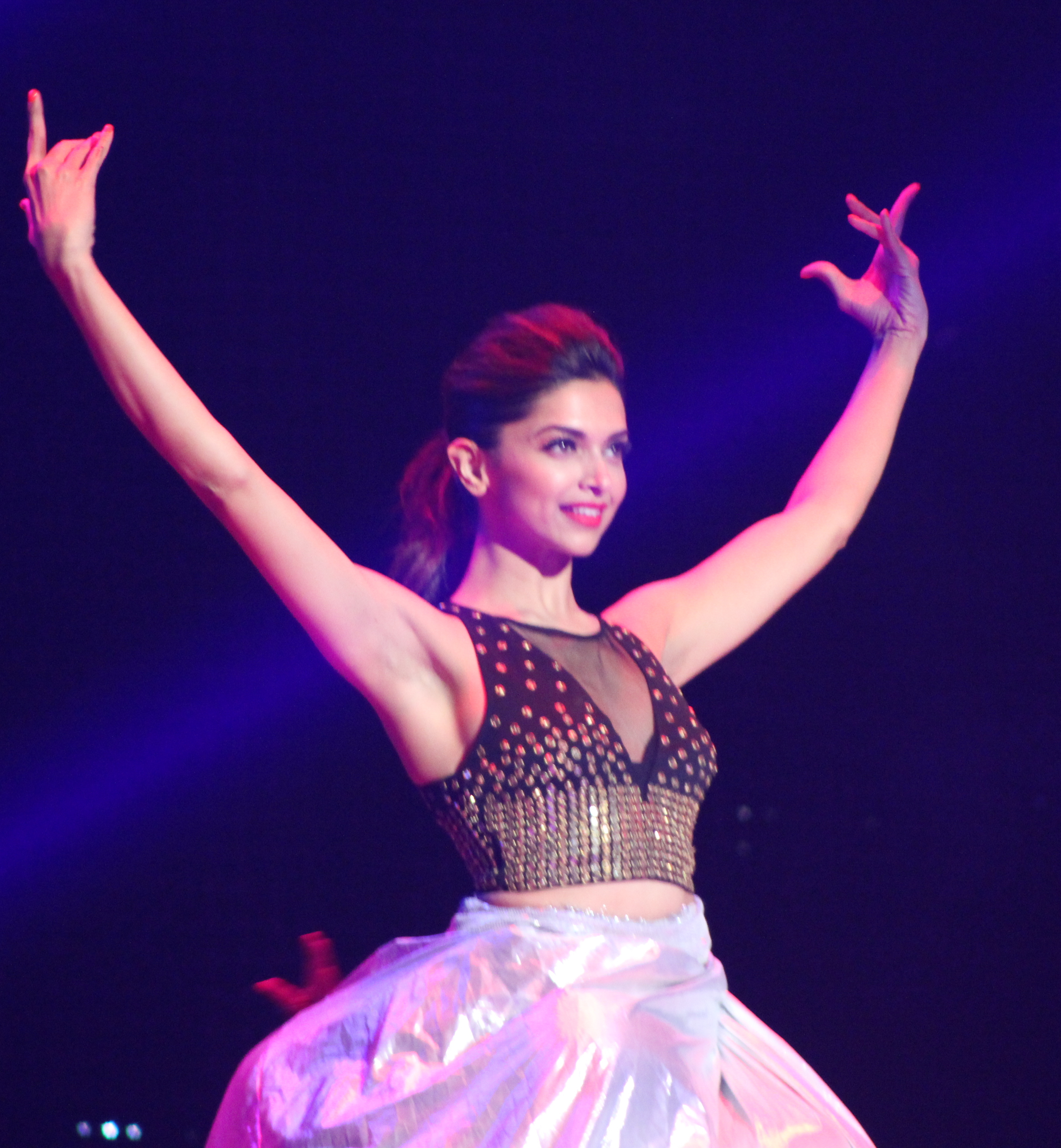
Padukone performing at the "SLAM! The Tour" concert in 2014

In addition to acting, Padukone has written opinion columns and has been involved with women's health and fitness magazines. She has also supported charitable organisations, and has performed for stage shows. In 2009, she was hired by Hindustan Times to write weekly columns for their lifestyle section; through these columns she interacted with her fans and passed details of her personal and professional life. That year, she participated in the World 10K Bangalore marathon, which raised ₹13.1 million (US$140,000) in support of 81 NGOs. In 2010, Padukone adopted the Maharashtrian village of Ambegaon as part of NDTV's Greenathon Campaign, to provide the village with a regular supply of electricity. She visited Indian jawans (troops) in Jammu, for an Independence Day special episode of NDTV's reality show Jai Jawaan.

Padukone took part in the opening ceremony of the third season of the Indian Premier League at the DY Patil Stadium in Navi Mumbai. Three years later, she performed alongside Shah Rukh Khan, Katrina Kaif, and Pitbull for the sixth edition of the Indian Premier League. In 2014, she participated in a concert tour across North America, entitled "SLAM! The Tour", in which she performed alongside her co-stars from Happy New Year. Padukone has also been involved with the Olympic Gold Quest team, established by her father and Geet Sethi to support Indian athletes at the Olympic Games, along with sports personalities such as Leander Paes and Viswanathan Anand and several other actors. In 2022, Padukone and Spanish footballer Iker Casillas unveiled the FIFA World Cup Trophy at the competition's final match in Qatar.

In 2013, she launched her own line of clothing for women, in association with the retail chain Van Heusen. Two years later, she collaborated with the fashion portal Myntra to launch another line under her brand "All About You". From 2019 to 2021, she served as the chairperson of the Mumbai Academy of the Moving Image. Through her own company, Ka Enterprises, Padukone has invested in several startups, including Drum Foods International, a fast-moving consumer goods company, and Blu Smart, an electric taxi. In 2022, she launched her own self-care brand, named 82°E, beginning with skincare products. The brand raised $7.5 million in seed funding to launch new products.

== Advocacy ==
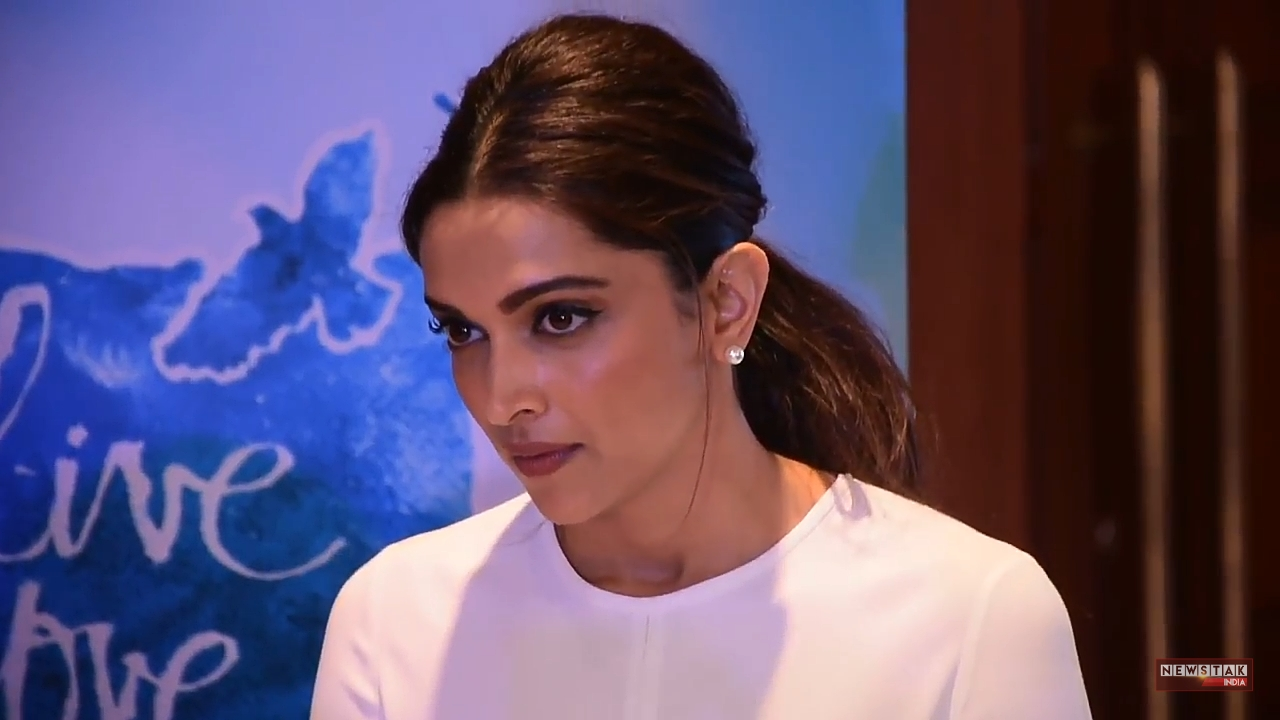
Padukone at an event for The Live Love Laugh Foundation in 2018

Padukone has also been outspoken on issues such as feminism and has said, "New feminism isn't about being aggressive; it's about reaching the top yet being soft. It's about being you – feminine, strong and full of will power." In a 2015 interview, Padukone spoke about her personal experience of overcoming depression, and in October that year she formed a foundation to create awareness on mental health in India, named The Live Love Laugh Foundation. The following year, she launched a campaign named More Than Just Sad to assist general physicians in their treatment of patients suffering from depression or anxiety. Also in 2016, the foundation teamed with Facebook and the AASRA organisation to launch multilingual tools and educational resources in Facebook's networking site to support people with suicidal tendencies. Padukone became the brand ambassador for the NGO Indian Psychiatric Society and on her foundation's first anniversary, the two organisations collaborated to launch the video and poster campaign #DobaraPoocho dedicated to victims and survivors of depression. The World Economic Forum presented her with the Crystal Award in 2020 for creating awareness on mental health.

In 2020, Padukone attended a protest for students who were brutalised during the 2020 JNU Attack due to their protests against the Citizenship Amendment Act. Members of the ruling Bharatiya Janata Party criticised her decision and asked people to boycott her film Chhapaak. Many others praised her for standing up against a crackdown on dissent, as mainstream Bollywood actors avoid making political statements fearing backlash and consequences on their film. When asked about the political backlash she has since faced, Padukone said, "I don't know if I'm supposed to feel something about it. But the truth is, I don't feel anything about it." Also in 2020, Padukone was criticised for a TikTok video aimed towards the promotion of her film Chhapaak, in which she asked users to recreate her "acid-attack survivor look" from the film which was deemed "insensitive" and "disrespectful" to acid-attack victims. Later that year, Padukone was among several Bollywood actors who were criticised for posting Instagram messages showing solidarity with the Black Lives Matter movement, despite their previous work advertising skin-lightening products which perpetuate colourism.

== Reception and public image ==
The journalist Vir Sanghvi, in 2013, described Padukone as "strong, someone who makes up her own mind, [and] has motivation within herself." She is particularly known in the media as a professional, disciplined performer, whose "work takes precedence over everything else". A reviewer for Rediff.com described her personality as "simple", "grounded", and "accessible", and wrote, "She takes criticism in her stride, acknowledges her limitations and strives to work hard at getting better. She handles praise with equal composure." In the book The Millennial Woman in Bollywood (2020) author Maithili Shyam Rao wrote that Padukone challenges conventional social and sexual mores through her on-screen roles and off-screen persona. Padukone maintains an active social media presence.

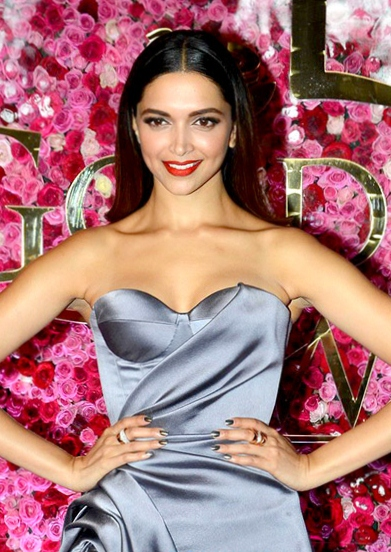
Padukone at an event for Lux in 2016

Padukone is considered among the most popular and high-profile celebrities in India. Analysing her career, Reuters published that after making a successful debut, she featured in a series of films for which critics labelled her as "wooden" and "mocked her accent". The Indian Express opined that "a few unwise script calls and the public blow up of her high profile relationship with Ranbir Kapoor" had resulted in a brief career setback. By 2013, several media publications began crediting her as the most successful contemporary actress in India. A decade later, a journalist for Time magazine took note of her longevity as a leading star, a rarity for women in Indian cinema. Also in 2023, Namrata Zakharia of The Week analysed that Padukone's acting career, brand endorsements, investments, philanthropy, and marriage to Ranveer Singh were collectively responsible in making her "India's most successful female celebrity". Padukone has said that her background in sports has lent her to treat her career like an athlete, and that her choice of roles is "a combination of where I am in life, what I am offered and what I am capable of doing".

India Today featured her among the nation's 50 most powerful people in 2017, 2019 and 2023, as did The Indian Express in 2018, 2019, 2023 and 2024. The global edition of Forbes ranked her as the tenth highest-paid actress in the world in 2016 and in 2018, the magazine ranked her as the highest-earning woman celebrity in India. From 2014 to 2016 and in 2018, she was the highest ranked woman on the Indian edition of Forbes' "Celebrity 100" list, peaking at the fourth position in 2018 with an estimated annual earning of over ₹1.12 billion (US$12 million). Also in 2018, Time magazine named Padukone one of the 100 most influential people in the world; Variety magazine featured her in their list of the 50 most impactful women in the world, and the market research firm YouGov named her the world's thirteenth most admired woman. On International Women's Day in 2022, Outlook India listed her as one of the women redefining leadership roles. In the same year, Padukone was awarded the Time100 Impact Award for her work with mental health advocacy. In 2023, she was featured by the Indian edition of Hello! magazine in their 100 most influential list. The Week estimated her net worth to be ₹500 crore (US$53 million) in 2023 and in 2024, GQ India ranked her fifth among richest Indian actresses. In 2024, Padukone topped IMDb's list of 100 Most Viewed Indian Stars.

Padukone ranks high on various listings of the most attractive Indian celebrities. In 2008, she topped Indian Maxim's "Hot 100" list, and in 2012, she was named "India's Most Beautiful Woman" by the Indian edition of People magazine. Padukone has frequently featured in The Times of India's listing of the "Most Desirable Woman", topping the list in 2012 and 2013. In 2010 and 2014, she was named the "World's Sexiest Woman" by the Indian edition of FHM. and she was selected by the UK magazine Eastern Eye as the "Sexiest Asian Woman" in 2016 and 2018, and later, of the decade. Madame Tussauds unveiled her wax statue in London in 2019. Taking note of her dress sense, Filmfare credited her as one of the "few actresses who experiments with colours, cuts and silhouettes". In the fitness book The Four-Week Countdown Diet, Padukone was cited by Namita Jain as "the ultimate role model for a healthy, fit and active lifestyle".

Padukone is an active endorser for several brands and products, including Tissot, Maybelline, Coca-Cola, and L'Oréal Paris, among others. In 2014, Business Standard reported that Padukone earned ₹50 million (US$530,000) to ₹60 million (US$640,000) per endorsement deal and TAM AdEX named Padukone the most visible face on television in India that year. She has regularly featured in Duff & Phelps' listings of Indian celebrities with the highest brand value, peaking at the second position in 2018 with an estimated brand value of US$102.5 million. In 2020, she became the first Indian brand ambassador for Louis Vuitton, and in 2022, she was named a brand ambassador for the luxury jewellery brand Cartier.

== Accolades ==
Padukone has been the recipient of three Filmfare Awards from 10 nominations: Best Female Debut for Om Shanti Om (2007), and two Best Actress awards for Goliyon Ki Raasleela Ram-Leela (2013) and Piku (2015).
