= List of awards and nominations received by Deepika Padukone =

Deepika Padukone awards and nominations
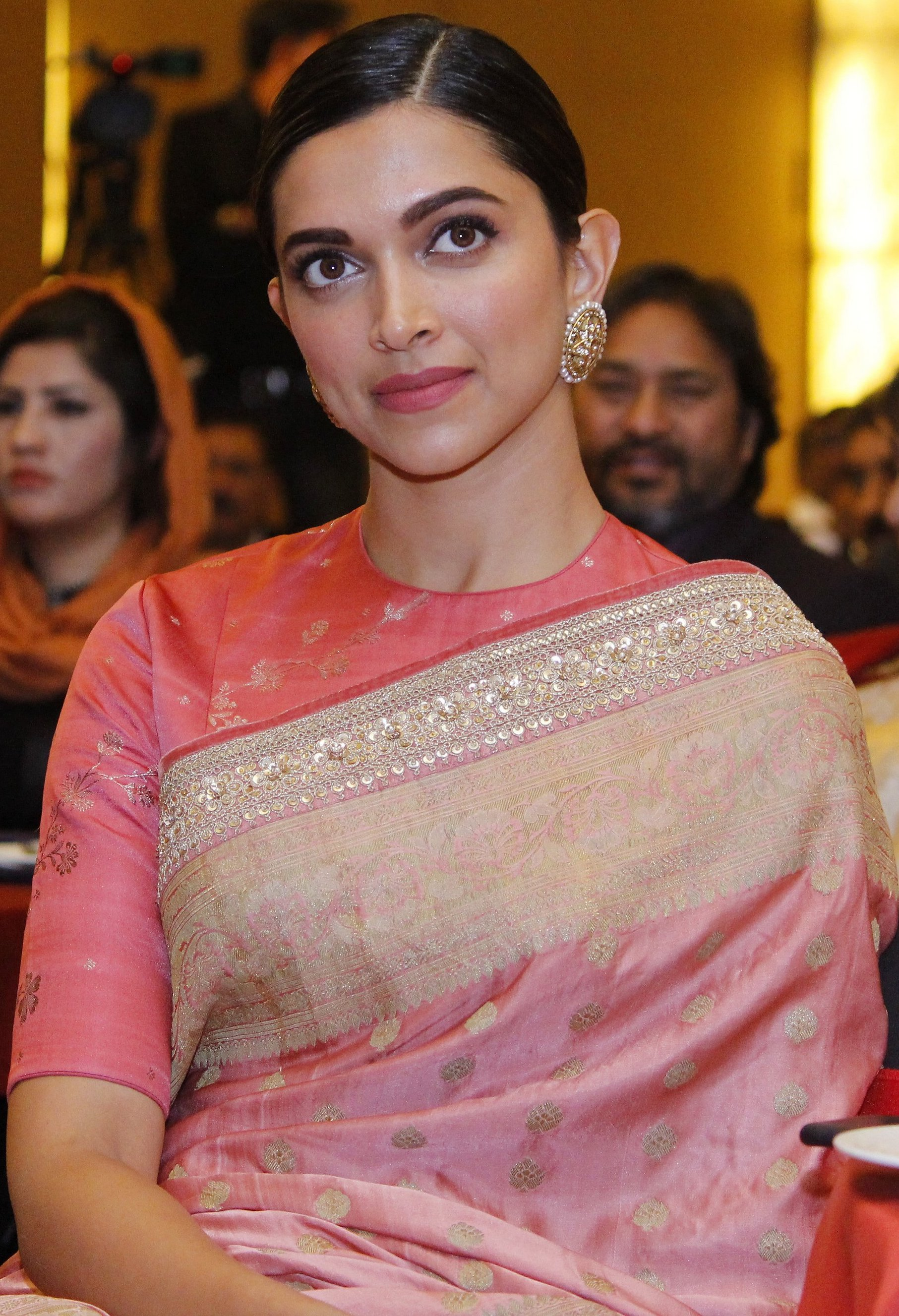
- Padukone in 2018
Awards and nominations
Award	Wins	Nominations
Smita Patil Memorial Award	1	1
Filmfare Awards	3	10
Screen Awards	10	17
Zee Cine Awards	7	15
Stardust Awards	3	13
Producers Guild Film Awards	5	11
IIFA Awards	7	15
Nickelodeon Kids' Choice Awards India	3	3
BIG Star Entertainment Awards	6	16
People's Choice Awards	0	1
Indian Film Festival of Melbourne	0	5
Teen Choice Awards	0	4
ETC Bollywood Business Awards	2	2

Totals (Note: Certain award groups do not simply award one winner. They acknowledge several different recipients, have runners-up, and have third place. Since this is a specific recognition and is different from losing an award, runner-up mentions are considered wins in this award tally. For simplification and to avoid errors, each award in this list has been presumed to have had a prior nomination.)
- Wins: 57
- Nominations: 127

Deepika Padukone is an Indian actress who prominently works in Hindi films. Padukone has received 57 accolades and honors throughout her career which includes three Filmfare Awards, seven IIFA, five Producers Guild Film Awards, ten Screen Awards, three Stardust Awards and seven Zee Cine Awards.

After her film debut in the 2006 Kannada film Aishwarya, Padukone entered Bollywood through the blockbuster reincarnation drama Om Shanti Om (2007), for which she received Best Debut awards at various ceremonies including the Filmfare Award for Best Female Debut and received her first Filmfare Award for Best Actress nomination. At the 3rd Asian Film Awards, she received a nomination for Best Actress for her role in the action comedy Chandni Chowk to China (2009). Her performances in the romantic comedy-dramas Love Aaj Kal (2009) and Cocktail (2012) earned her recognition at various award ceremonies, including nominations for Best Actress at Filmfare and IIFA.

== Asian Film Awards ==
The Asian Film Awards are presented annually by the Hong Kong International Film Festival society to recognize excellence of those in the Asian film industry. Padukone has received two nominations.

Year	Nominated work	Category	Result	Ref.
2008	Om Shanti Om	Best Actress	Nominated	
2009	Chandni Chowk to China	Best Actress	Nominated	

== BIG Star Entertainment Awards ==
The BIG Star Entertainment Awards is an annual event organised by the Reliance Broadcast Network. Padukone has won six awards from sixteen nominations.

Year	Nominated work	Category	Result	Ref.
2010	—N/a	New Talent of the Decade – Female	Nominated	
2012	Cocktail	Most Entertaining Actor in a Romantic Film – Female	Won	
2012	Cocktail	Most Entertaining Film Actor – Female	Nominated	
2013	Race 2	Most Entertaining Actor in a Thriller Film – Female	Nominated	
2013	Yeh Jawaani Hai Deewani	Most Entertaining Actor in a Romantic Film – Female	Nominated	
2013	Yeh Jawaani Hai Deewani	Most Entertaining Actor (Film) – Female	Nominated	
2013	Chennai Express	Most Entertaining Actor (Film) – Female	Won	
2013	Chennai Express	Most Entertaining Actor in a Comedy Film – Female	Won	
2013	Chennai Express	Best Romantic Couple (along with Shah Rukh Khan)	Won	
2013	Goliyon Ki Raasleela: Ram-Leela	Most Entertaining Actor (Film) – Female	Nominated	
2013	Goliyon Ki Raasleela: Ram-Leela	Most Entertaining Actor in a Romantic Film – Female	Nominated	
2013	Goliyon Ki Raasleela: Ram-Leela	Most Entertaining Dancer {for the song "Nagada Sang Dhol"}	Nominated	
2014	Happy New Year	Most Entertaining Actor in a Comedy Film – Female	Nominated	
2014	Happy New Year	Most Entertaining Dancer {for the song "Lovely"}	Nominated	
2015	Piku	Most Entertaining Actor (Film) – Female	Won	
2015	Piku	Most Entertaining Actor in a Drama Film – Female	Won	

== CNN-IBN Indian of the Year ==
The CNN-IBN Indian of the Year is an award presented annually by CNN-IBN since 2006 to Indians who have been judged to have helped strengthen society and build Brand India during the year. Padukone has received one award from two nominations.

Year	Nominated work	Category	Result	Ref.
2013	—N/a	Special Achievement Award	Won	
2013	—N/a	Entertainment	Nominated	

== ETC Bollywood Business Awards ==
The ETC Bollywood Business Awards are presented annually by ETC Bollywood Business to award Bollywood films. This is the only award in India which judges films based on their box-office performances.

Year	Nominated work	Category	Result	Ref.
2013	Chennai Express Yeh Jawaani Hai Deewani Goliyon Ki Raasleela Ram-Leela Race 2	Highest Grossing Actress of the Year	Won	
2013	—N/a	Social Queen	Won	

== Filmfare Awards ==
The Filmfare Awards is one of the oldest and most prominent Hindi film award ceremonies. They are presented annually by The Times Group to honour both artistic and technical excellence. Padukone has won four awards from 10 nominations.

Year	Nominated work	Category	Result	Ref.
2008	Om Shanti Om	Best Female Debut	Won	
2008	Om Shanti Om	Best Actress	Nominated	
2008	Om Shanti Om	Fresh Face of the Year Best Actress		
2008	-	Fresh Face of the Year Best Actress	won	
2010	Love Aaj Kal	Fresh Face of the Year Best Actress	Nominated	
2013	Cocktail	Fresh Face of the Year Best Actress	Nominated	
2014	Chennai Express	Fresh Face of the Year Best Actress	Nominated	
2014	Goliyon Ki Raasleela: Ram-Leela	Fresh Face of the Year Best Actress	Won	
2016	Bajirao Mastani	Fresh Face of the Year Best Actress	Nominated	
2016	Piku	Fresh Face of the Year Best Actress	Won	
2019	Padmaavat	Fresh Face of the Year Best Actress	Nominated	
2021	Chhapaak	Fresh Face of the Year Best Actress	Nominated	
2024	Pathaan	Fresh Face of the Year Best Actress	Nominated	

== Indian Film Festival of Melbourne ==
The Indian Film Festival of Melbourne (IFFM) is an annual Indian film festival based in Melbourne, Australia. It is presented by Film Victoria and the State Government of Victoria, and produced by Mind Blowing Films, a Melbourne-based distributor of Indian cinema across Australia and New Zealand. Padukone has received five nominations.

Year	Nominated work	Category	Result	Ref.
2014	Goliyon Ki Raasleela: Ram-Leela	Best Actress	Nominated	
2015	Piku	Best Actress	Nominated	
2016	Bajirao Mastani	Best Actress	Nominated	
2018	Padmaavat	Best Actress	Nominated	
2023	Gehraiyaan	Best Actress	Nominated	

== International Indian Film Academy Awards ==
The International Indian Film Academy Awards (IIFA Awards) are organised by Wizcraft International Entertainment Pvt. Ltd. to honour members of the Bollywood film industry. Padukone has received seven awards from fifteen nominations.

Year	Nominated work	Category	Result	Ref.
2008	Om Shanti Om	Best Female Debut	Won	
2008	Om Shanti Om	Best Actress	Nominated	
2010	Love Aaj Kal	Best Actress	Nominated	
2013	Cocktail	Best Actress	Nominated	
2014	Chennai Express	Best Actress	Won	
2014	Goliyon Ki Raasleela: Ram-Leela	Best Actress	Nominated	
2014	Yeh Jawaani Hai Deewani	Best Actress	Nominated	
2014	Yeh Jawaani Hai Deewani	Jodi of the Year (along with Ranbir Kapoor)	Won	
2014	—N/a	Entertainer of the Year	Won	
2015	Happy New Year	Best Actress	Nominated	
2015	—N/a	Woman of the Year	Won	
2016	Bajirao Mastani	Best Actress	Nominated	
2016	Piku	Best Actress	Won	
2019	Padmaavat	Best Actress	Nominated	
2019	Chennai Express	IIFA 20 Years Award for Best Actress	Won	
2019	Piku	IIFA 20 Years Award for Best Actress	Nominated	

== NDTV Indian of the Year ==
The NDTV Indian of the Year is an annual award presented by NDTV. Padukone has received two awards.

Year	Category	Result	Ref.
2014	Entertainer of the Year	Won	
2016	Actor of the Year (Female)	Won	

== People's Choice Awards India ==
The People's Choice Awards India is the Indian version of the American awards show recognising Indian film, television, music and sports. Padukone has received one nomination.

Year	Nominated work	Category	Result	Ref.
2012	—N/a	Favorite Movie Youth Icon	Nominated	

== Producers Guild Film Awards ==
The Producers Guild Film Awards (previously known as the Apsara Film & Television Producers Guild Awards) are presented by the Producers Guild to honour and recognise the professional excellence of their peers. Padukone has received five awards from eleven nominations.

Year	Nominated work	Category	Result	Ref.
2008	Om Shanti Om	Best Female Debut	Won	
2010	—N/a	Chevrolet Heartbeat of the Nation (Female)	Won	
2010	Love Aaj Kal	Best Actress in a Leading Role	Nominated	
2013	Cocktail	Best Actress in a Leading Role	Nominated	
2014	Chennai Express	Best Actress in a Leading Role	Won	
2014	Goliyon Ki Raasleela: Ram-Leela	Best Actress in a Leading Role	Nominated	
2014	Yeh Jawaani Hai Deewani	Best Actress in a Leading Role	Nominated	
2015	Happy New Year	Best Actress in a Leading Role	Nominated	
2015	Finding Fanny & Happy New Year	Entertainer of the Year	Won	
2016	Bajirao Mastani	Best Actress in a Leading Role	Nominated	
2016	Piku	Best Actress in a Leading Role	Won	

== Screen Awards ==
The Star Screen Awards is a yearly ceremony honouring professional excellence in the Hindi language film industry. Padukone has won ten awards from sixteen nominations.

Year	Nominated work	Category	Result	Ref.
2008	Om Shanti Om	Most Promising Newcomer – Female	Won	
2008	Om Shanti Om	Jodi No. 1 (along with Shah Rukh Khan)	Won	
2010	Love Aaj Kal	Best Actress	Nominated	
2011	Housefull	Best Actress (Popular Choice)	Nominated	
2012	Desi Boyz	Best Actress (Popular Choice)	Won	
2013	Cocktail	Best Actress (Popular Choice)	Nominated	
2013	Cocktail	Best Actress	Nominated	
2014	—N/a	Life Ok Screen Hero Award	Won	
2014	Chennai Express & Goliyon Ki Raasleela: Ram-Leela	Best Actress (Popular Choice)	Won	
2014	Chennai Express & Goliyon Ki Raasleela: Ram-Leela	Best Actress	Won	
2015	Finding Fanny	Best Actress	Nominated	
2015	Finding Fanny	Best Ensemble Cast	Nominated	
2015	Happy New Year	Best Actress (Popular Choice)	Won	
2016	Bajirao Mastani	Best Actress (Popular Choice)	Won	
2016	Piku	Best Actress	Won	
2017	—N/a	Best Style Icon	Won	
2018	Padmaavat	Best Actress	Nominated	

== South Indian International Movie Awards ==
South Indian International Movie Awards, rewards the artistic and technical achievements of the South Indian film industry. Padukone has received one nomination.

Year	Nominated work	Category	Result	Ref.
2025	Kalki 2898 AD	Best Actress – Telugu	Pending	

== Stardust Awards ==
The Stardust Awards are presented by Stardust magazine. They honour professional excellence in the Hindi film industry. Padukone has won three awards from thirteen nominations.

Year	Nominated work	Category	Result	Ref.
2008	Om Shanti Om	Superstar of Tomorrow – Female	Nominated	
2010	Love Aaj Kal	Superstar of Tomorrow – Female	Nominated	
2011	Karthik Calling Karthik	Best Actress in a Thriller or Action	Nominated	
2011	Housefull	Best Actress in a Comedy or Romance	Nominated	
2012	Aarakshan	Best Actress in a Comedy or Romance	Nominated	
2012	Desi Boyz	Best Actress in a Drama	Nominated	
2012	—N/a	Style Icon of The Year	Won	
2013	Cocktail	Best Actress in a Drama	Nominated	
2014	Finding Fanny & Happy New Year	Star of the Year – Female	Won	
2014	Finding Fanny	Best Actress	Nominated	
2014	Happy New Year	Best Actress in a Thriller or Action	Nominated	
2015	Piku & Tamasha	Star of the Year – Female	Won	

== Asiavision Awards ==
The Asiavision Awards have been held annually since 2006 to honor the artistes and technicians of Indian cinema and television. Padukone has received one award from this event.

Year	Recipient	Category	Result	Ref.
2017	Deepika Padukone	Global Icon of India	Won	

== Teen Choice Awards ==
The Teen Choice Awards is an annual US award ceremony show that airs on the Fox Network. The awards honor the year's biggest achievements in music, movies, sports, television, fashion and other categories, voted by teen viewers.

Year	Nominated work	Category	Result	Ref.
2017	xXx: Return of Xander Cage	Choice Action Movie Actress	Nominated	
2017	xXx: Return of Xander Cage	Choice Breakout Movie Star	Nominated	
2017	xXx: Return of Xander Cage	Choice Movie Ship (along with Ruby Rose)	Nominated	
2017	—N/a	Choice Female Hottie	Nominated	

== Cosmopolitan Fun Fearless Awards ==
The Cosmopolitan Fun Fearless Awards is an annual award that celebrates achievers. That year featured a notable roster of successful individuals. Padukone has received two awards respectively.

Year	Recipient	Category	Result	Ref.
2012	Deepika Padukone	Most Stylish Female Actor	Won	
2009	Deepika Padukone	Sexiest Female	Won	

== Zee Cine Awards ==
The Zee Cine Awards are presented by Zee Entertainment Enterprises for the Hindi film industry. The awards were inaugurated in 1998 and are a mixture of categories decided on by public votes and by an industry jury. The awards were not presented in 2009 and 2010, but were resumed from 2011. Padukone has won seven awards from Fifteen nominations.

Year	Nominated work	Category	Result	Ref.
2008	Om Shanti Om	Best Female Debut	Won	
2008	Om Shanti Om	Best Actor – Female	Nominated	
2011	Break Ke Baad	Best Actor – Female	Nominated	
2011	—N/a	International Female Icon	Won	
2013	Cocktail	Best Actor – Female	Nominated	
2014	—N/a	Dhamakedar Performer	Won	
2014	Chennai Express	Best Actor – Female	Won	
2014	Goliyon Ki Raasleela: Ram-Leela	Best Actor – Female	Nominated	
2014	Yeh Jawaani Hai Deewani	Best Actor – Female	Nominated	
2016	Piku	Best Actor (Critics) – Female	Won	
2016	Piku	Best Actor – Female	Nominated	
2016	Bajirao Mastani	Best Actor – Female	Won	
2016	Bajirao Mastani	Best Actor (Critics) – Female	Nominated	
2019	Padmaavat	Best Actor (Critics) – Female	Won	
2023	Gehraiyaan	Best Actor – Female	Nominated	
2024	Pathaan	Best Actor – Female	Nominated	

== Nickelodeon Kids' Choice Awards India ==
The Nickelodeon Kids' Choice Awards India is the Indian version of the American awards show recognising Indian Film, TV, Music and Sports.

Year	Award / Organisation	Category	Result	Ref.
2013	Nickelodeon Kids' Choice Awards India	Most Popular Actress	Won	
2016	Nickelodeon Kids' Choice Awards India	Best Actress (Female) – Bajirao Mastani	Won	
2018	Nickelodeon Kids' Choice Awards India	Power House Performer of the Year – Padmaavat	Won	

== International honors and media titles ==
Year	Award / Organisation	Category	Ref.
2017	Cannes Lions International Festival of Creativity	Gold Lion for Nike's Da Da Ding campaign	
2017	The Academy of Motion Picture Arts and Sciences	Invited As New Membership	
2019	Guinness World Records	Highest Earning Bollywood Actress With 112.8C	
2020	Crystal Award by World Economic Forum	for her The Live Love Laugh Foundation	
2020	Mirchi Music Awards	Make It Large Award (Chhapaak)	
