= Farwiza Farhan =

Indonesian environmental activist

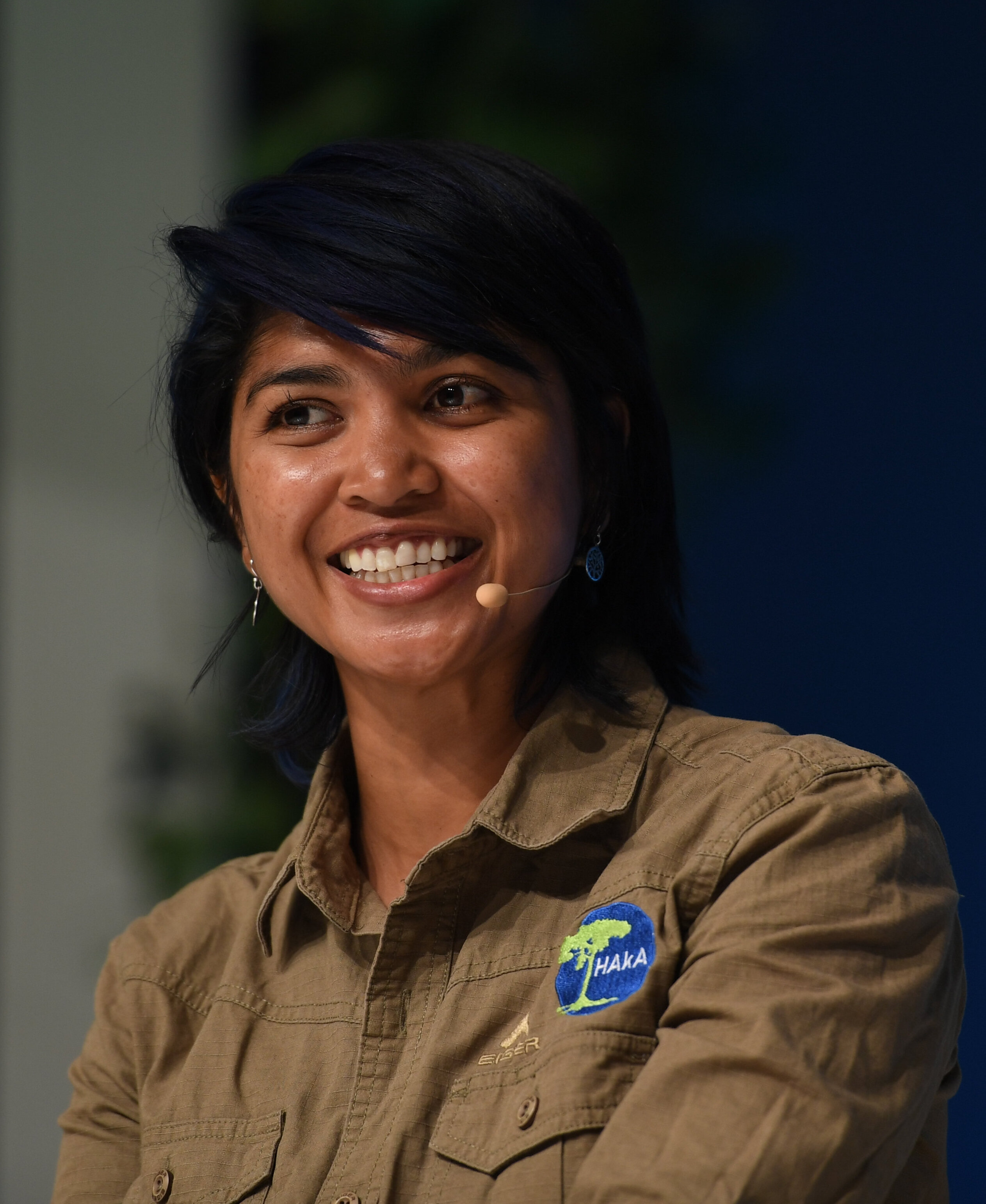
- Farhan in 2019
- Born: Aceh, Indonesia
- Occupations: Environmental activist; Conservationist
- Organization(s): Executive Director of Forest, Nature, and Environment Aceh
- Awards: Perpetual Planet Pioneering Laureate 2026, Whitley Gold Award 2026, Ramon Magsaysay Award 2024, Time100 Impact Award 2023, Time 100 Next 2022, Whitley Award 2016

Farwiza Farhan is an Indonesian environmental activist most known for her role as the President of Forest, Nature, and Environment Aceh, in which capacity she has fought for protections of the Leuser Ecosystem, a vast rainforest in Indonesia. She has been awarded the Whitley Award, the Whitley Gold Award, the Time100 Impact Award Impact Award, and the Ramon Magsaysay Award, and was included in the Time 100 Next in 2022.

== Biography ==
Farhan was born and raised in Aceh, and at a young age became interested in exploring different environments. She earned a BS in Biology from the Universiti Sains Malaysia and a Masters in Environmental Management from the University of Queensland and is enrolled in a PhD from the Radboud University Nijmegen, and worked in a governmental agency focused on managing and protecting the Leuser Ecosystem.

Her first time there began difficult, but she soon decided to focus on protecting the ecosystem. She began to realize the scale of the problems the ecosystem faced not long after, and after being fired, co-founded HaKA (Forest, Nature, and Environment Aceh), where she serves as Executive Director.

She has led the organization since its founding, and gained international attention for a 2022 legal victory against a palm oil producer, securing $26 million dollars to repair the forest. She has also led projects including wildlife protection, coordination with grassroots activists, and repealing a hydroelectric dam set to run through elephant territory.

She was included in the Time 100 Next in 2022: her profile was written by Jane Goodall. She was also awarded the Time100 Impact Award in 2023. She was awarded the Whitley Award in 2016, known as the "Green Oscars", and was awarded the Whitley Gold Award in 2026. She was also awarded the Ramon Magsaysay Award, sometimes called Asia's Nobel Prize, in 2024. She was awarded the UCLA Pritzker Environmental Award in 2021, and was named a Perpetual Planet Pioneering Laureate in 2026 by the Rolex Awards for Enterprise. She received the National Geographic Society Wayfinder Award in 2022.

She was also included in Forbes Sustainability Leaders 2025, which stated that her team "dismantles snares and... fast-tracks prosecution for wildlife crimes."
