= Time100 Impact Awards =

Annual awards

Time100 Impact Awards are an extension of Time magazine's Time100 Most Influential People. These awards recognize those who have made a significant impact on their industries and world.

The first edition of award was held in March 2022 in Dubai at the Museum of the Future. The third edition of the award was issued on 2 October 2022 at the National Gallery Singapore in partnership with Singapore Economic Development Board.

== Recipients ==
=== February 2022 ===
- Actress and philanthropist Deepika Padukone for her work in mental health struggles and raising awareness through her foundation the Live Love Laugh.
- Sarah Al Amiri, chairwoman of UAE Space Agency, for her role in helping to take the UAE to Mars.
- British-Ghanaian architect David Adjaye, whose designs include the National Museum of African American History and Culture in the US for his work of reorienting the world’s attention and shining a light on cultures from every corner of the world.
- Nigerian economist Tony Elumelu for his efforts, through his eponymous foundation, in empowering African entrepreneurs to create jobs on the continent.
- Makeup artist Huda Kattan for disrupting what it means to be beautiful
- Musician Will.i.am for his advocacy work on forward-thinking tech and artificial intelligence strategies.

=== March 2022 ===
- English singer-songwriter, author and activist Ellie Goulding was honored with the award in recognition of her longstanding work toward advancing climate change awareness.

=== October 2022 ===
- Actor and producer Alia Bhatt for her contribution to the entertainment industry
- Former James Webb Space Telescope program director Gregory L. Robinson
- Computational geneticist Dr. Pardis Sabeti
- Filipina singer, actress, and columnist Lea Salonga for being a life-long "role model for children of color".

=== April 2023 ===
- American film director and producer Steven Spielberg received the award at the 2023 Time100 Gala. The award was presented by actors Drew Barrymore and Ke Huy Quan who began their careers as child actors in Spielberg's E.T. the Extra-Terrestrial and Indiana Jones and the Temple of Doom, respectively.

== See also ==
- Person of the Year
