= AASRA =

Mumbai-based mental health NGO

- Founded: 13 September 1998
- Registration no.: E 2047 (registered as a Public Charity under the Bombay Charity Act, 1960)
- Purpose: Mental health, telephone counselling
- Location: Mumbai, India
- Origins: Befrienders Worldwide; Samaritans
- Key people: Johnson Thomas (Director)
- Website: www.aasra.info

AASRA (stylized as: आसRa) is a Mumbai-based mental health not-for-profit organization known for operating a 24-hour helpline for individuals who are suicidal and emotionally distressed. The service is an offshoot of Befrienders Worldwide and the Samaritans, with the India chapter established in 1960.
