= Laxmi Agarwal =

Indian acid attack survivor (born 1990)

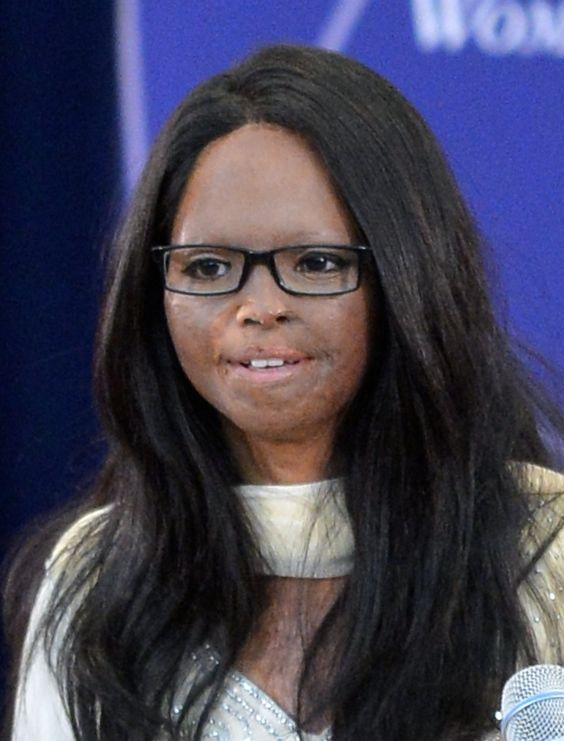
- Agarwal in Washington receiving an award, 2014
- Born: 1 June 1990 (age 36)
- Known for: Acid attack survivor
- Children: 1

Laxmi Agarwal (born 1 June 1990) is an Indian acid attack survivor, a campaigner for rights of acid attack victims, and a TV host. In 2019, she received with the International Women Empowerment Award from the Ministry of Women and Child Development, the Government of India, and UNICEF for her campaign of Stop Acid Sale. In 2014, she received the International Women of Courage Award.

== The attack ==
In 2005, at 15 years old, Agarwal rejected a marriage proposal from Naeem Khan, a 32-year-old family friend. 10 months later, Agarwal rejected Khan's proposal once again. Soon after, Khan threw acid in Agarwal's face from the back of a motorbike, driven by an accomplice.

== Public interest litigation ==
In 2006, Agarwal filed a public interest litigation (PIL) in the Supreme Court of India seeking compensation and a total ban on the sale of acid across the country.

In July 2013, the Supreme Court responded to pleas, including the dismissal of Agarwal, by issuing guidelines to restrict the sale of acid.

The court passed an order stating that acid could not be sold openly or without an ID proof. The court also declared a Rs 3 lakh compensation for future and past victims.

== Personal life ==
Laxmi Agarwal was in a live-in relationship with social activist Alok Dixit, and the couple has separated in 2015. They have a daughter.

== In popular culture ==
She starred in the 2014 short documentary Newborns directed by Megha Ramaswamy as herself.

Chhapaak (2020), a Hindi-language drama film inspired by Agarwal's life story. The central character, Malti, is modeled on Agarwal, though the narrative is a dramatised account rather than a direct biopic. Prior to the film's release, Agarwal's lawyer Aparna Bhat filed a case claiming that her contributions in Agarwal's legal battle and activism were not acknowledged. In January 2020, the Delhi High Court directed the filmmakers to give her due credit, after which her name was added to the film's credits.
