= Piku =

2015 film by Shoojit Sarcar

- Theatrical release poster
- Directed by: Shoojit Sircar
- Written by: Juhi Chaturvedi
- Produced by: N. P. Singh; Ronnie Lahiri; Sneha Rajani
- Starring: Deepika Padukone; Amitabh Bachchan; Irrfan Khan; Jishu Sengupta; Mousumi Chatterjee
- Cinematography: Kamaljeet Negi
- Edited by: Chandrashekhar Prajapati
- Music by: Anupam Roy
- Production companies: MSM Motion Pictures; Saraswati Entertainment; Rising Sun Films
- Distributed by: Yash Raj Films
- Release date: 8 May 2015 (India)
- Running time: 122 minutes
- Country: India
- Language: Hindi
- Budget: ₹42 crore
- Box office: ₹141 crore

Piku is a 2015 Indian Hindi-language comedy drama film directed by Shoojit Sircar, written by Juhi Chaturvedi, and produced by N. P. Singh, Ronnie Lahiri and Sneha Rajani. The film stars Deepika Padukone in lead role as Piku Banerjee Amitabh Bachchan,and Irrfan Khan, with Moushumi Chatterjee, Jisshu Sengupta and Raghubir Yadav in supporting roles. The soundtrack was composed by Anupam Roy. Principal photography began in August 2014 and was wrapped up in December.

The film was released on 8 May 2015, and garnered critical acclaim, with praise for its screenplay, humour and overall simplicity, and particular praise directed towards the performances of Bachchan, Padukone and Khan. It also emerged as a commercial success worldwide. Made on a budget of ₹42 crore (equivalent to ₹69 crore or US$7.2 million in 2026), Piku earned ₹141 crore (equivalent to ₹232 crore or US$24 million in 2026) worldwide.

At the 61st Filmfare Awards, Piku received 8 nominations, including Best Film, Best Director (Sircar), and Best Actor (Bachchan) and won 5 awards, including Best Actress (Padukone). Bachchan won his record-setting fourth National Film Award for Best Actor at the 63rd National Film Awards and his record-setting third Filmfare Award for Best Actor (Critics) for his performance in the film.

== Plot ==
Piku Banerjee (Deepika Padukone) is a 30-year-old Bengali architect who resides in Chittaranjan Park, Delhi along with her 70-year-old widowed father, Bhashkor Banerjee (Amitabh Bachchan). The hypochondriac Bhashkor has problems with chronic constipation and traces the root of every problem to his bowel movements. His habits often lead to arguments between Piku, the servants and Piku's maternal aunt, Chhobi Mashi (Moushumi Chatterjee), who often visits them. Piku loves her father and, as her mother has died, takes good care of him, but at the same time, also gets extremely irritated with him because of his eccentricities. Bhashkor has several medical tests done, but everything comes out to be normal, severely disappointing him. Ignoring Piku's vehement objections, he has also recently fired the maid for stealing phenyl, a charge that the maid opposes, and this is the fifth maid that Bhashkor has fired in the last two months. Moreover, Bhashkor is also opposed to the institution of marriage and wants Piku to take care of him to satisfy her maternal urge. He states that marriage is a low IQ decision, and that he wanted Piku's late mother to be independent, but she wasted her life in the service of him. Bhashkor also criticises Chhobi Maashi for marrying thrice and states that her own daughter, Eisha (Rupsa Banerjee), was never a priority for her.

Piku's business partner, Sayyed Afroze (Jisshu Sengupta), is a good friend of taxi business owner Rana Chaudhary (Irrfan Khan), whose taxi Piku always uses to commute to her workplace, but is notorious for being a very difficult customer. Regularly stressed both by her work and by her father's finicky behaviour, Piku criticises the taxi drivers with excessive backseat driving, due to which they lose focus and cause several car crashes. As no taxi driver at Rana's company wants to take Piku's duty, Rana complains to Sayyed but Piku brushes both of them off, offended by Rana's rude nature, and tells Sayyed that she is taking a break from the office. When Piku goes for a date with Aniket (Akshay Oberoi), Bhashkor keeps interrupting her, claiming that he has a fever, and makes such a fuss that Piku has to call his regular doctor, Dr. Srivastava (Raghuvir Yadav), and talk about Bhashkor's feces texture and temperature, causing Aniket to lose all appetite. Bhashkor also has a bit too much to drink at Chhobi Mashi's marriage anniversary party and later dances at home, which results in his blood pressure dropping and him being put on oxygen therapy, leaving Piku distraught. Elsewhere, Rana has his own family problems with his widowed mother and sister. Rana's sister stole her mother-in-law's jewellery and gave it to her mother, due to which her husband abandoned her along with their baby.

Bhashkor's relative, Nabendu (Aniruddha Roy Chowdhury), arrives from Kolkata to secure his consent to sell their ancestral home named Champakunj there. Nabendu tells that a builder is interested in the land and is willing to pay top rates, but Bhashkor objects vehemently and decides to visit Kolkata to stop the deal. Piku has to comply in accompanying him, since she cannot let him travel alone after the recent health scare. Bhashkor cannot travel by aeroplane due to his breathing problem and even refuses to travel by train as he receives constipation due to all the rhythmic movement. Bhashkor decides to travel by road, so that he can stop wherever he wants for excretion and receive some blood circulation going in his body, but none of Rana's taxi drivers are willing to endure Piku or her father. Disappointed with the taxi company, Piku tries to book a flight to Kolkata, but Rana personally arrives at their home to take the family to Kolkata himself, without informing his mother and sister about the trip. Rana is puzzled when he finds loads of baggage being loaded onto the car along with a lavatory chair for Bhashkor.

During the road trip to Kolkata, the group encounters many incidents, including Rana on the verge of losing patience due to Bhashkor's fussy behaviour and his constipation. Piku finds a large knife in Rana's car trunk, and Bhashkor insists Rana to throw the knife away or else he would not travel by the car. Rana pleads that the knife was kept by drivers for their road traffic safety, but has to eventually compromise and throw the knife away. During discussion, Rana reveals that he is an engineer and had a job in civil construction in Saudi Arabia. However, he was made to work as security guard on the site, despite being offered a job as project manager. When Rana protested, he was fired and that is when he returned to India to manage his family business established by his late father. They spend the night at a hotel in Varanasi, where Rana shares a room with Piku and Bhashkor as all other rooms are full and he refuses to sleep in the car. The next morning, Bhashkor tries Indian toilet-style sitting upon Rana's suggestion, which does not seem to help either.

The group finally reaches Kolkata, where Bhashkor's younger brother and sister-in-law still reside in Champakunj, and Bhashkor asks Rana to stay for a day. Piku and Rana spend time with each other in the city and gradually grow close. Rana also subtly hints Piku to not sell Champakunj during a discussion. The next day, Rana leaves Kolkata after advising Bhashkor to stop his eccentricities which he eventually agrees to. Piku changes her mind and decides not to sell Champakunj. Meanwhile, Bhashkor's sudden desire for bicycling increases after Dr. Srivastava gives him the news of a Japanese bicyclist having died at the age of 99. Believing that he will also live a long life by doing so, Bhashkor ends up bicycling through a part of the city alone, leaving everyone tensed since Bhashkor did not inform anyone about it. When Bhashkor returns, Piku berates him for eating street food and for being irresponsible, but Bhashkor simply states that his constipation is cleared, and that he that needs to bicycle every day. He also remembers Rana having advised him to eat everything and not to be dependent on anyone. Piku is secretly happy but does not emote much.

The next day, everyone discovers that Bhashkor has died in his sleep, probably from sleep apnea or cardiac arrhythmia. Piku states that Bhashkor always wished for a peaceful death, and that his only health problem was constipation which was also cleared on the day before his death. She returns to Delhi, where she arranges Bhashkor's funeral. While there, Dr. Srivastava reveals to Piku that Sayyed, too, has constipation and Bhashkor was aware about it for a long time, causing Piku to get annoyed with Sayyed. A few days later, Piku pays up whatever due she owes Rana and he appreciates her for having taken care of her father like an ideal daughter. Piku renames her Delhi residence "Bhashkor Villa" in her father's memory, and the maid, who had left due to Bhashkor's tantrums, returns to work. The film ends with a scene of Piku playing badminton with Rana in the courtyard in front of her house.

== Cast ==
- Amitabh Bachchan as Bhashkor Banerjee, Piku's father
- Deepika Padukone as Piku Banerjee
- Irrfan Khan as Rana Chaudhary, a taxi business owner and Syed's friend
- Jisshu Sengupta as Syed Afroze, Piku's business partner
- Moushumi Chatterjee as Chhobi Mashi, Piku's maternal aunt
- Avijit Dutt as Bodo Mesho, Chhobi Maashi's husband
- Balendra Singh as Budhan, the Banerjees' servant
- Swaroopa Ghosh as Moni Kaki, Piku's paternal aunt
- Raghuvir Yadav as Dr. Srivastava, Bhashkor's doctor
- Aniruddha Roy Chowdhury as Nabendu
- Rupsa Banerjee as Eisha
- Oindrila Saha as Nisha
- Sumanto Chattopadhyay as Saurob
- Akshay Oberoi as Aniket (cameo appearance)

== Production ==
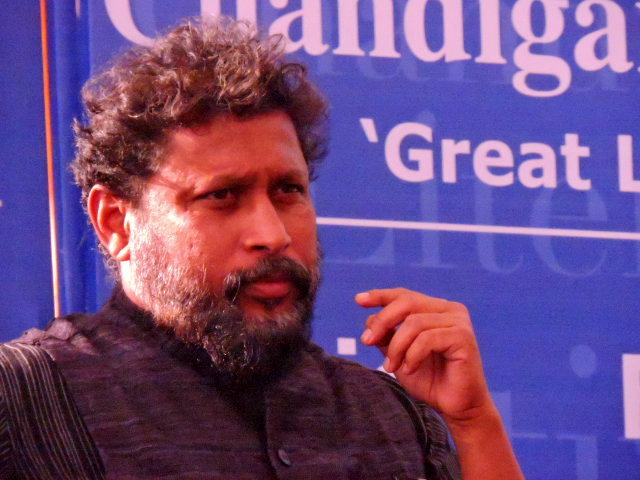
Shoojit Sircar, Director of Piku

=== Casting ===
Shoojit Sircar's original choices of the main cast were Parineeti Chopra in the title role, Amitabh Bachchan and Irrfan Khan. These three actors were given the script. However, Chopra turned down the part. The cast of Deepika Padukone, Amitabh Bachchan and Irrfan Khan was finalised in mid-2014. In preparation for the role of Piku, Padukone learned Bengali as her character is from Bengal. There were early reports that Jisshu Sengupta was cast as the romantic lead opposite Deepika Padukone, but Sengupta plays Padukone's character's best-friend. Irrfan Khan plays the romantic lead opposite Deepika Padukone. Bachchan essays the role of Piku's father, while Moushumi Chatterjee portrays Piku's maternal aunt. Akshay Oberoi was cast in a cameo.

=== Filming ===
Principal photography for Piku began in August 2014, when the film's first schedule took off in Kolkata. The first schedule for Piku was also filmed in Delhi and Mumbai and included indoor scenes. The second schedule of filming started on 30 October 2014 in Kolkata, mostly in the north. Specifically, shooting took place at the Howrah Bridge, in the city's Shyambazar neighbourhood and at Bishop Lefroy Road. During the shooting at Howrah Bridge, Bachchan bicycled around the city dressed as his character. The Kolkata schedule was completed on 18 November 2014 and shooting now shifted to Delhi and Patdi Near Surendranagar in Gujarat.

The "Journey Song" was shot in Gujarat in December 2014 on the state highway connecting Ahmedabad to Bhuj. Shooting in Delhi took place at Gurgaon cyber hub and city club where Padukone and Khan were seen filming. The film was wrapped up after its last schedule shot in Varanasi. Padukone and Khan shot on the ghats of Banaras under chilly conditions and attracted a crowd. Shoojit Sircar said Piku was not written with an interval in mind, but because of the tendency of Indian theatre operators to force intervals into films during screenings, Sircar decided to accommodate an interval during the editing stage.

== Music ==
Piku

Soundtrack album by Anupam Roy
- Released: 21 April 2015
- Genre: Feature film soundtrack
- Length: 23:05
- Language: Hindi
- Label: Zee Music Company

The music of the film is composed by Anupam Roy while the lyrics are penned Anupam Roy and Manoj Yadav. The first song, "Journey Song", was released on 1 April 2015. The official music album was released online on April 21, 2015.

Track listing
No.	Title	Lyrics	Singer(s)	Length
1.	"Bezubaan"	Manoj Yadav, Anupam Roy	Anupam Roy	05:41
2.	"Journey Song"	Anupam Roy	Anupam Roy, Shreya Ghoshal, Anuj Gurwara, S. Janaki	04:12
3.	"Lamhe Guzar Gaye"	Anupam Roy	Anupam Roy	04:18
4.	"Piku"	Manoj Yadav	Sunidhi Chauhan	03:26
5.	"Teri Meri Baatein"	Anupam Roy	Anupam Roy	05:28
Total length:				23:05

== Marketing ==
The makers of the film released a video of day one on the sets of Piku which is called Piku Begins. The video has the cast speak about what viewers can expect from the film. As a part of promotions, the makers released on-set pictures of the shooting where the main cast are seen in character. Bachchan's first look was revealed — depicting his character of an old Bengali man with long hair and a big belly. On 25 March 2015, as part of the promotion, Deepika revealed the poster of the film through her Twitter handle.

== Reception ==
=== Box office ===
Piku grossed ₹2.0 crore (US$210,000) in India on its opening day. On Saturday, the film earned ₹13 crore (US$1.3 million), showing a growth of 65%. On Sunday, it earned ₹11 crore (US$1.1 million), for a domestic weekend total of ₹24.5 crore (US$2.5 million). Internationally, Piku had the biggest opening weekend for a Hindi film of 2015, earning over US$2 million. Box Office India reported that the film had a "very strong hold" on its first Monday in India, earning ₹25 crore (US$2.6 million), and it eventually earned ₹60 crore (US$6.2 million) at the end of its first week. In ten days, the film earned ₹70 crore (US$7.3 million) in India. The film earned ₹22 crore (US$2.3 million) in its second week, and Box Office India projected that the film would earn around ₹80 crore (US$8.3 million) domestically at the end of its theatrical run.

=== Critical response ===
On the review aggregator website Rotten Tomatoes, 92% of 25 critics' reviews are positive, with an average rating of 7.3/10. The website's consensus reads: "A cab driver (Irrfan Khan) is caught between a dysfunctional father (Amitabh Bachchan) and daughter (Deepika Padukone) as he drives them to Calcutta."

Raja Sen of Rediff.com gave Piku 4.5 out of 5 stars, writing that it is a "film with tremendous heart -- one that made me guffaw and made me weep and is making sure I'm smiling wide just thinking about it now -- but also a sharp film, with nuanced details showing off wit, progressive thought and insightful writing". In a 4 out of 5 star review, The Times of India praised the writing, direction and performances. Pratim D. Gupta of The Telegraph India gave an average of 7/10, saying "Don’t go in with a lot of laugh-out-loud expectations and you will enjoy Piku for what it is –– a simple, slice-of-life bittersweet tale about a family fighting constipation". Gayatri Sankar of Zee News gave 4 out of 5 stars and wrote "In totality, Piku is a wonderful family film, which will certainly make you wear a broad smile." Taran Adarsh of Bollywood Hungama gave the film 3.5 stars out of 5 and said "On the whole, Piku is a must watch this season as it brings back the memories of the legendary directors Hrishikesh Mukherjee, Basu Chatterjee and likes".

Rajeev Masand of CNN-IBN gave 4 stars out of five and said "Piku, directed by Shoojit Sircar, is a charming, unpredictable comedy that – like Sircar's Vicky Donor – mines humor from the unlikeliest of places". Anuj Kumar of The Hindu gave it a positive review, saying "A slice of life that deals with the practical difficulties in loving your aging parents in a light-hearted, feel good way, Piku is a progressive piece of cinema that brings the parent back into the picture". Sweta Kaushal of Hindustan Times praised the portrayal of a strong, independent female protagonist and noted on how well Sircar presents a "realistic view of a typical Indian family". Anupama Chopra gave 4 out of 5 stars and said "Piku is a delightful film about very little and yet it says so much. This isn't a movie focused on reaching a destination. This is a movie about the journey, both literal and emotional". Saibal Chatterjee of NDTV gave 3.5 stars out of 5 and called it a "magnificently original film that delivers a memorably unique movie experience" and praised the performance of the three leads. Tanmaya Nanda of Business Standard praised the film for its feminist tone and its unique approach in dealing with scatological humour. Namrata Joshi of Outlook gave 3 out of 5 stars, and wrote "Piku goes into an atypical zone for a Hindi mainstream film. It breaks the plot-driven, high on drama rule and yet manages to forge a big connect with the audience; The slice-of-life film has characters, relationships and interactions that feel real and evoke empathy in viewers—be they aging parents or their caregivers".

On the contrary, Shubhra Gupta of The Indian Express gave 2.5 out of 5, saying "Piku sparks in moments, and I threw my head back and guffawed in a few. But the rest of it stays only mildly amusing. I wanted more motion in these motions". Rachel Saltz of The New York Times wrote "Piku, directed by Shoojit Sircar from a script by Juhi Chaturvedi, isn't a typical Hindi movie. It lopes along, following no formula beyond the roughest outlines of a romantic comedy."

In 2019, Film Companion ranked Padukone's performance among The 100 Greatest Performances of the Decade.

== Accolades ==
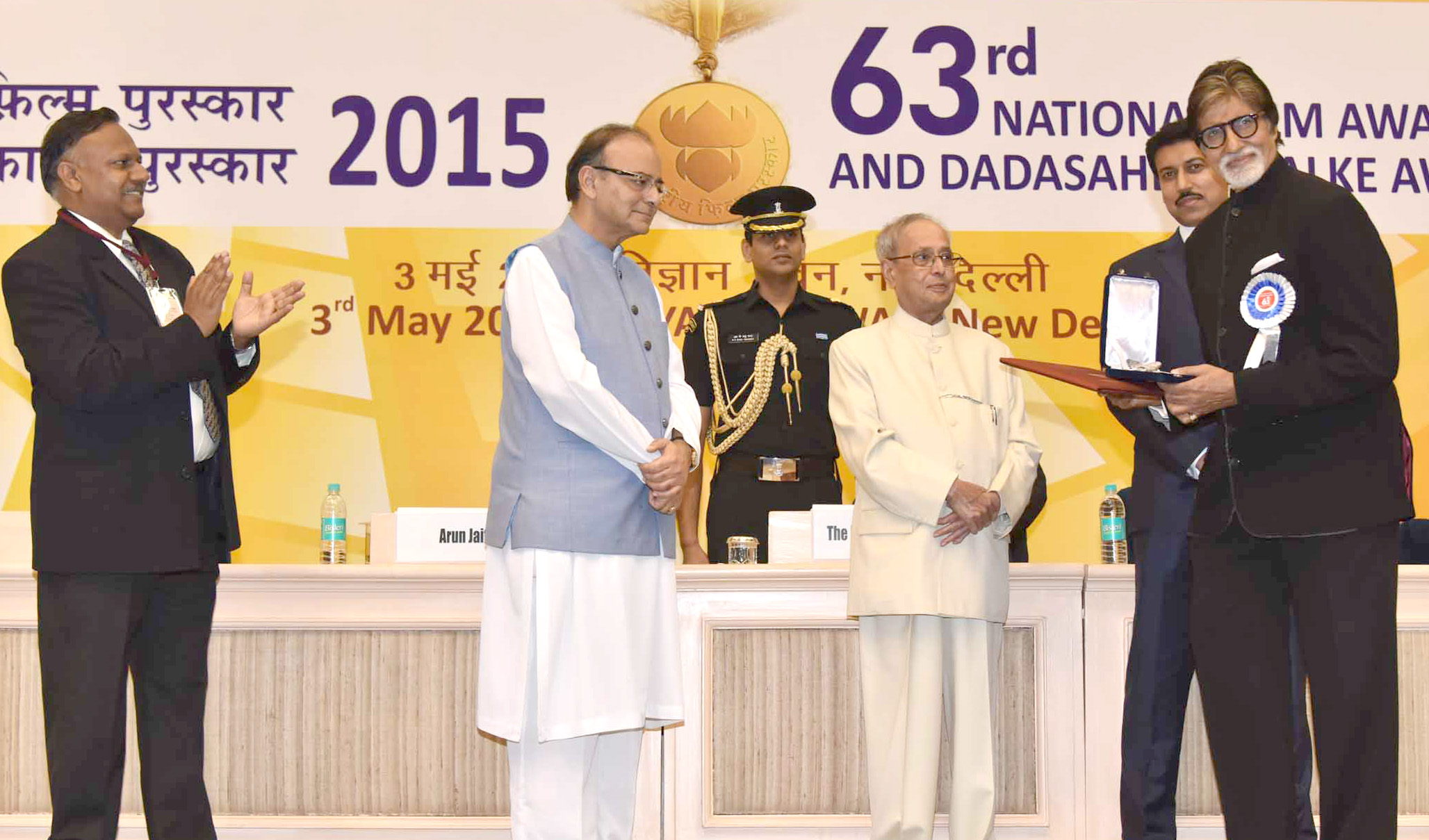
Amitabh Bachhan's performance in Piku garnered widespread critical acclaim winning him the National Film Award for Best Actor at the 63rd National Film Awards.
