= The Live Love Laugh Foundation =

Mental health nonprofit

- Founded: 2014
- Founder: Deepika Padukone
- Type: Community Service
- Purpose: Mental health
- Key people: Anna Chandy, Kiran Mazumdar Shaw, Dr. ShyamK. Bhat, Anirban Das Blah, Nina Nair
- Website: www.thelivelovelaughfoundation.org

The Live Love Laugh Foundation is a non-profit organization that deals with mental health issues.

== History ==
The Live Laugh Love Foundation was founded by Indian actress Deepika Padukone, who had spoken about her experience with depression, along with a board of trustees. Padukone created this foundation to bring more awareness to mental health and to reduce the stigma of it in India. Padukone said she decided to create this foundation is because, "In India, 90 percent of people who suffer from depression don't seek help." Padukone uses social media as a tool to encourage others to share their personal experiences/stories with mental illness, using the hashtag, #NotAshamed. The year after Padukone founded the Live Love Laugh Foundation, she launched a campaign called "More Than Just Sad" to assist general physicians in properly treating patients with depression or anxiety. Padukone is also the brand ambassador for the NGO Indian Psychiatric Society, which is the largest association of Indian psychiatrists.

In 2016, the organization launched a program called "You Are Not Alone". Facebook was working with the organization to prevent suicides from being livestreamed.

== Focus ==
The focus of the Live Love Laugh Foundation is to reduce the stigma that surrounds mental health. The foundation spreads awareness and changes the way people look at mental health in general. It provides a platform that enables people who are seeking help to learn more information and connect with mental health professionals. People are able to share and hear others' stories of their own experiences with mental health.

== Funding ==
This is a non-profit organization. It is currently being funded by sponsors and volunteers who are able to give their time or others who are able to make donations. Anyone who chooses to donate can also specify where they would like their donation to go. The donations can go specifically to the school program, the rural program, or to the foundation in general.
