= Bhal region =

Coordinates: 22°11′30″N 72°16′30″E

Bhal region ભાલ, भाल
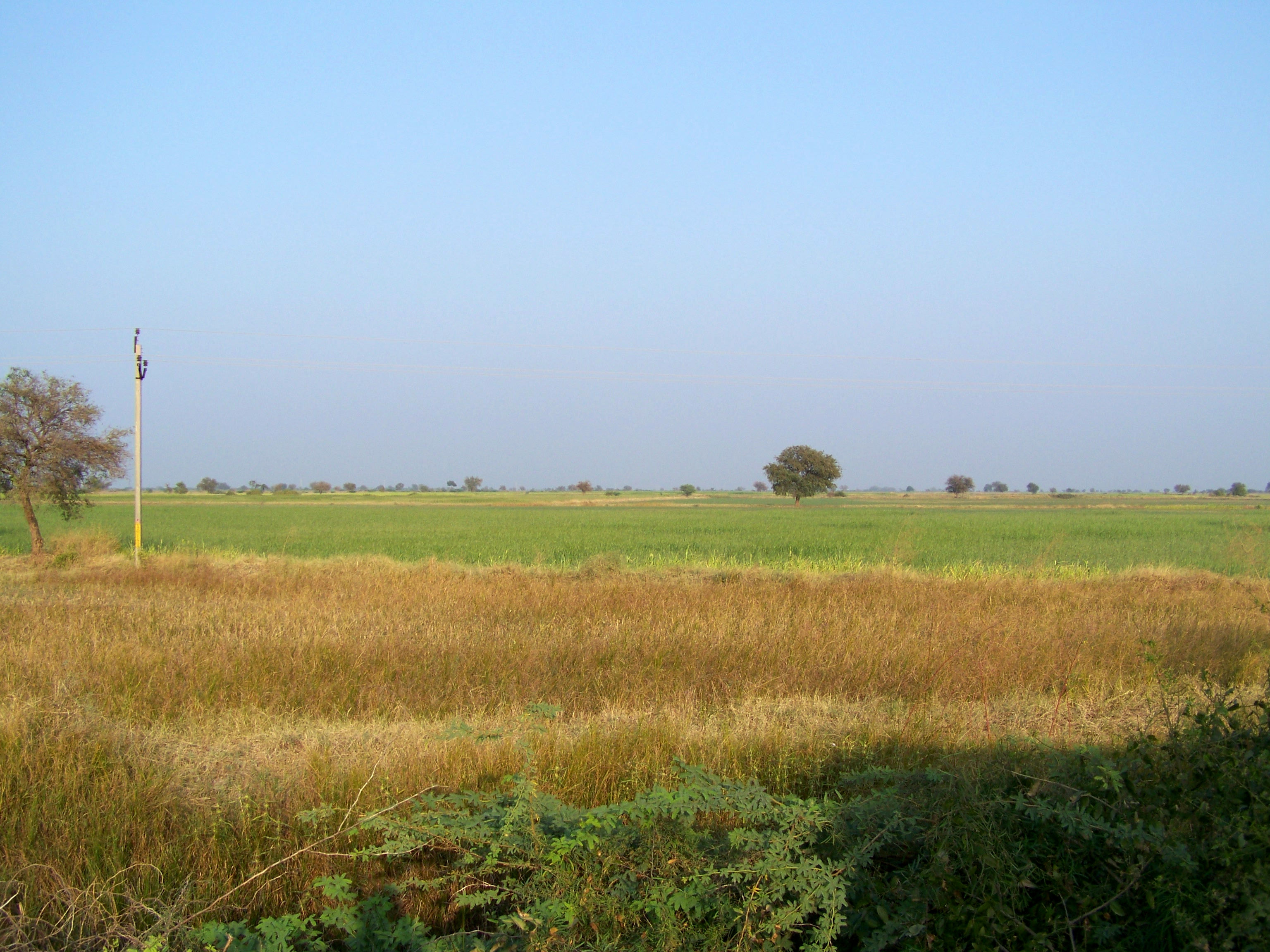
- A field full of Bhalia wheat (A wheat sub-species) in Bhaal region of Gujarat State
- Interactive map of Bhal region
- Country: India
- State: Gujarat
- Named for: Derived from Sanskrit word भाल meaning forehead

The Bhal region is an area of Gujarat, India. It is spread across the political boundaries of the districts of Bhavnagar, Ahmedabad, and Anand. The Bhal region is situated on the deltas of the Sabarmati, Bhogawo, Bhadar, Lilka and other rivers that flow east and southeast off the Kathiawar peninsula into the Gulf of Cambay. The word Bhaal (Gujarati: ભાલ) (Hindi: भाल) seems to have been derived from the Sanskrit word भाल which means forehead. Such a name is given to this region probably because it is mostly as flat as a forehead with almost entire region's soil without any stones, pebbles or gravel.

Bhalia Wheat is a major farm cultivation in the region.

== Flowing through Bhal region ==
Bhada (Bhaadar)

Gautami

Ghelo

The Ghelo River starts near Babra in Amreli district and meets the Gulf of Cambay in the Bhal Region.

Kalubhar

The Kalubhar River starts near Babra in Amreli District and meets the Gulf of Cambay in the Bhal Region. The Rangholi River is a major tributary.

Lilka

Limdi no Bhogavo

Meshvo

Ootavali

Sabarmati

The Sabarmati River is at the northeastern end of the Bhal. The Vatrak River and the Bhogawo Rivers are major tributaries of the Sabarmati.

Surendranagar no Bhogavo

== Wildlife and birds ==
- Velavadar Blackbuck National Park
- Pipli Wetland
- Saltpans & wetlands between Naari & Bawaliyali villages

== Archaeological and historical sites ==
- Gangad
- Uteliya
- Lothal
- Gamph

Gangad and Uteliya was a small state of India, Ruled by Vaghela Rajput Clan Gangad Village Maharana Saheb Shri Ramshangji Vishaldevji Vaghela of Gangad Sansthan after attaining the heavenly abode, Patvi Kumar Saheb Shri Prithirajji Ramshangji Vaghela of Gangad Sansthan sat on his throne. Maharana Saheb Shri Prithirajji Ramshangji Vaghela of Gangad Sansthan was the daughter of Adeshangji Ashkaranji, the younger brother of Rani Shiyani, whose son was Sheshmalji, who was a Patvi, and the daughter was Ladkunvarba, who was married to Chandrawat Joravarsinhji of Rampura in Malwa. The second daughter was Mavkunvarba; she was married to Rao Deshalji of Bhuj. This Goranjiba was very generous and kind. He has built a Vav in the Gangad basin which is still seen in good condition.

Which Vav Samvat 1763 year Shaka 1658 Pravartaman was built on this day in the Shukla Paksha of the month of Ashadh in addition to 1 and 2 times on Raveu Pushya Nakshatra.

Information Source:- Shri Jaideepsinhji Ashoksinhji Vaghela of Gangad

Information Compilation:- Royal History and State

Gamph was a small state of India, ruled by chudasama Rajputs. There are 52 Estates of Chudasama Rajputs in the Dhandhuka area which all are the Bhayads of former Gamph state. These Rajputs are descended from the old Rah Dynasty of Junagadh.

Navaghana (late 11th century king), The King of Junagadh have 5 sons, Whom elder son Bhimji given the Jagir of Bhadli. Second son Satrasalji given the jagir of Sarva, later known as Sarvaiya rajputs on the name of village Sarva. Third and fourth son Devghanji and Savghanji given Osham Chorasi. Fifth son Raa Khengar succeeded him, his descendant Raa Bhupatsinhji of Junagadh was called as "Raizada" Mahommed Begda, Sultan of Ahemdabad so they are later known as Raizada Rajputs. Bhimjis descendants continued the main branch of chudasama. Later they moved to Bhal region. Raisalji established new capital Gorasu in 1572. His Grandson Amarsinhji abandoned Gorasu and established Gamph in 1633, it remained Capital of Chudasama Rajputs. In 1947, Vikramsinhji Manharsinhji Chudasama, The Thakore Saheb of Gamph merged his State into India.

== Pilgrimage sites ==
- Gorasu - Chudasama Rajput's Sahayak Devi Khodiyar Mataji Temple
- Bhadiyad - Chudasama Rajputs Kuldevi Bhavani Mataji Temple
- Arnej - Bootbhawani Mataji temple
- Gangad - Ambaji Vagheshwari Mataji temple Vaghela Rajput Clan in Gangad Darbargadh + Bootbhawani Mataji Temple + Gorajiba Vav + Hanuman Mandir
- Kauka - Bootbhawani mataji temple+ Bapasitaram temple
- Bawaliyali - Radha-Krishna temple
- Dholka - Kalikund tirth Jain Temple
- Ganpatipura - Swayambhu Ganpati Idol & temple + Swaminarayan Mandir
- Nani Boru - Lord Shiva Temple built by Prashnora Nagar Brahmin community
- Bhadiyad - Pir Mehmudshah Bukhari Dargah Sharif and Mosque
- Varna-lord hanumanji temple
- Gorad [Gohil Mitali State Bhayat] Rajput's Shahayak Devi Ma Kodiyar Temple
- Swaminarayan Temple "Dholera- Madanmohanji Maharaj","Budhej" and "Gorad"
- Akru-Madhavanand Aashram

== Fairs ==
- Urash Mubarak of Bhadiyad pir
- Gangad Hanuman no medo

== New projects coming in Bhal region ==
- Dholera International Airport
- Ahmedabad - Dholera - Bhavnagar six-lane expressway
- Gandhinagar - Ahmedabad - Dholera metro rail

== See also ==
- Gandhinagar — Capital of Gujarat
- Vibrant Gujarat
