= Tori (Rampur) =

- village
- Location in Gujarat, India Tori (India)
- Coordinates: 21°37′12.5″N 70°52′53.8″E
- Country: India
- State: Gujarat
- District: Amreli
- Taluka: Kunkavav Vadia

Government
  - Body: Gram Panchayat
- Elevation: 148 m (486 ft)

Population (2011)
  - Total: 3,540

Languages
  - Official: Gujarati, Hindi
- Time zone: UTC+5:30 (IST)
- PIN: 365480
- Telephone code: 02796
- Vehicle registration: GJ-14
- Nearest town: Bagasara (20 km)
- Website: gujaratindia.com

Tori is a village located near the Taluka headquarters of Kunkavav Vadia, in the Amreli district of the Indian state of Gujarat. The village is situated in the southern part of Saurashtra region,(also known as Kathiawar), which became part of the Western Kathiawar Agency,from 1926 onwards.

== Geography ==
It is in a hilly and semi arid region of southern Saurashtra.The village is surrounded by small hills and dry plains. It lies near the Survo River and Shetrunji River, an important source of irrigation. However, seasonal flooding may occur during monsoon in low-lying areas.

== Climate ==
Climate data for Tori (near Amreli), 1991–2020, extremes 1973–present

Climate data for Tori (near Amreli, Gujarat)
| Month | Jan | Feb | Mar | Apr | May | Jun | Jul | Aug | Sep | Oct | Nov | Dec | Year |
|---|---|---|---|---|---|---|---|---|---|---|---|---|---|
| Record high °C (°F) | 36.6 (97.9) | 39.4 (102.9) | 43.6 (110.5) | 45.6 (114.1) | 46.2 (115.2) | 39.1 (102.4) | 39.1 (102.4) | 38.6 (101.5) | 40.1 (104.2) | 42.1 (107.8) | 38.2 (100.8) | 36.6 (97.9) | 46.2 (115.2) |
| Mean daily maximum °C (°F) | 29.6 (85.3) | 32.4 (90.3) | 36.8 (98.2) | 40.4 (104.7) | 41.0 (105.8) | 35.2 (95.4) | 32.7 (90.9) | 31.4 (88.5) | 32.5 (90.5) | 35.3 (95.5) | 33.7 (92.7) | 30.8 (87.4) | 34.3 (93.8) |
| Mean daily minimum °C (°F) | 11.7 (53.1) | 14.7 (58.5) | 19.1 (66.4) | 23.2 (73.8) | 28.5 (83.3) | 27.6 (81.7) | 26.3 (79.3) | 25.4 (77.7) | 24.5 (76.1) | 23.5 (74.3) | 17.2 (63.0) | 13.1 (55.6) | 21.2 (70.2) |
| Record low °C (°F) | 1.6 (34.9) | 3.5 (38.3) | 9.1 (48.4) | 12.1 (53.8) | 16.4 (61.5) | 21.4 (70.5) | 23.6 (74.5) | 23.3 (73.9) | 18.4 (65.1) | 14.4 (57.9) | 9.1 (48.4) | 1.6 (34.9) | 1.6 (34.9) |
| Average precipitation mm (inches) | 0.0 (0.0) | 0.0 (0.0) | 0.0 (0.0) | 0.0 (0.0) | 3.2 (0.13) | 113.0 (4.45) | 213.3 (8.40) | 139.9 (5.51) | 109.5 (4.31) | 25.1 (0.99) | 4.9 (0.19) | 0.3 (0.01) | 609.2 (23.99) |
| Average rainy days (≥ 0.1 in) | 0.0 | 0.0 | 0.1 | 0.2 | 0.5 | 5.2 | 9.0 | 7.1 | 5.5 | 1.2 | 0.4 | 0.0 | 29.2 |
| Average relative humidity (%) | 28 | 22 | 19 | 19 | 29 | 54 | 69 | 72 | 64 | 42 | 33 | 30 | 40 |
Source: Based on data from Amreli (India Meteorological Department)

Tori village experiences a semi-arid climate, typical of inland Saurashtra. Summers (March to mid-June) are extremely hot and dry, with maximum temperatures frequently exceeding 40 °C. The monsoon season spans from mid-June to September and delivers the majority of the yearly rainfall, averaging around 600 mm. Winters (November to February) are mild and dry, with temperatures ranging between 13 °C and 31 °C and relatively low humidity.

== Notable people ==
- Ashvin Borad, Indian Photographer, line producer, and executive producer.

== See also ==
- List of districts of Gujarat
- Leuva Patel
