= Babra taluka =

Taluka Gujarat, India

- Taluka
- Interactive map of Babra taluka
- Coordinates: 21.8441667°N 71.3041667°E
- Country: India
- State: Gujarat
- District: Amreli
- Headquarters: Babra

Population (2011)
  - Total: 140,521
  - Sex ratio: 954 ♂/♀
  - Literacy: 62.5%

Languages
  - Official: Gujarati, Hindi
- Time zone: UTC+5:30 (IST)
- Telephone code: +91-079
- Vehicle registration: GJ
- Website: amreli.nic.in

Babra Taluka is a sub-divisional administrative region situated within the Amreli district of the state of Gujarat, India.

== Geography ==
Map of Amreli district

Babra Taluka is a geographical sub-division located in the southern part of Saurashtra region in the western Indian state of Gujarat.
