= Amrapur, Amreli =

Coordinates: 21°36′57″N 71°02′10″E

Amrapur is a village situated in the Kunkavav Vadia Taluka of Amreli district in the state of Gujarat, India. As per government records, the village bears the census code 515426. It spans a total geographical area of 2,347.64 hectares (approximately 23.47 square kilometers. The village has a population of 3,618 people.

== Notability ==
Dharmeshbhai Mathukiya gained recognition for earning ₹1.5 crore annually through innovative chilli farming and exports, despite having formal education only up to class 8. His success story has been widely covered in national media.
