= Mota Zinzuda =

- village
- Location in Gujarat, India Mota Zinzuda (India)
- Coordinates: 21.3284°N 71.3769°E
- Country: India
- State: Gujarat
- District: Amreli

Population (2019)
  - Total: 4,965

Languages
  - Official: Gujarati, Hindi
- Time zone: UTC+5:30 (IST)
- Postal code: 364515
- Telephone code: 02845
- Vehicle registration: GJ-14
- Website: gujaratindia.com

Mota Zinzuda (Village ID 515780) is a village near Savar Kundla, Amreli District, India. It is located 6 km from Savar Kundla. Mota Zinzuda is situated approximately 37 km away from the district headquarters of Amreli.

The village is also home to a temple located on a mountain, which is revered by the local population. There is a PHC (Primary Health Care) center in Mota Zinzuda that provides care for residents in 17 nearby villages.

Nana Zinzuda is an adjacent village to Mota Zinzuda. Discussions on merging both the villages into a single village named Zinzuda are ongoing. The two areas of the newly merged village will be called Mota and Nana corresponding to the location of Mota Zinzuda and Nana Zinzuda respectively. Mota Zinzuda is home to various Shaivite temples of reverence such as: Nilakanth Mahadev, Bhadeshwar Mahadev, NanaZinzuda-Som Temple, Kanteswar Mahadev, Rameswar Mahadev, and Ramji Mandir.

The village also houses two temples dedicated to the Hindu God Hanuman namely Gadadhari Mahavir temple and Hanumanji Mandir.

According to the 2011 Census, the total population of this village is 4,965 with 2,561 males and 2,404 females. There are about 972 houses in Mota Zinzuda.

== Geography ==
Savarkundla is situated on the southern Saurashtra plateau. The terrain is hilly with the groundwater table being very low. The water contains a high level of TDS counts, along with excess levels of sodium and phosphates. Because of this, water extracted from the bore-wells has been found to be very hot.

== Education ==
Mota Zinzuda has a Government school and an Aangan Wadi. Some students go to Savar Kundla, and Pithavdi, Vanda and Amreli for further study.
