= Chogath =

Village in Bhavnagar district, Gujarat, India

Coordinates: 21.8264568°N 71.8523975°E

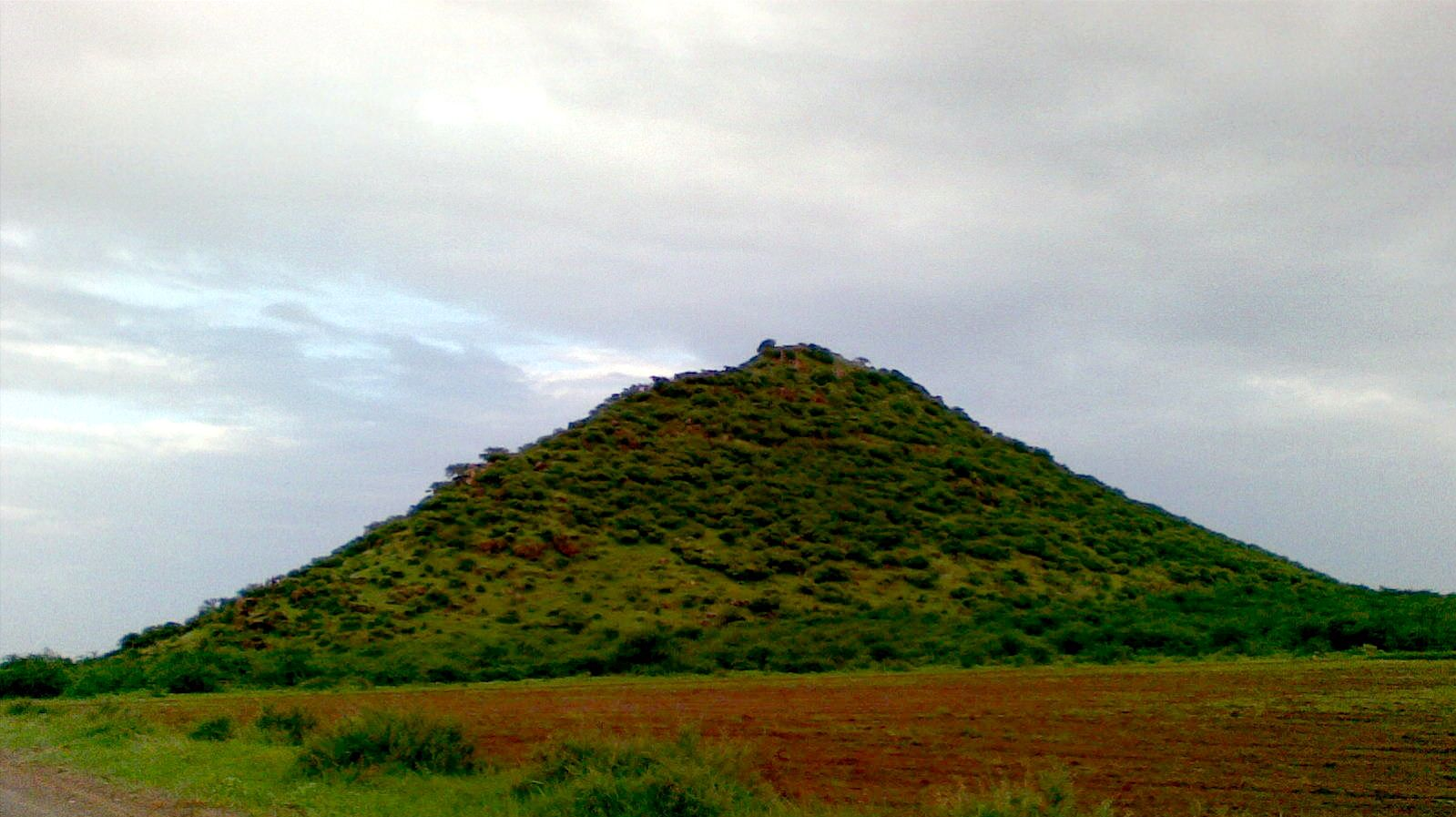
Chogath Hills

Chogath (Thapnath) is a village in Umrala Taluka of Bhavnagar district, Gujarat, India. It is a former princely state.

== Demographics ==
In 1872, the population had reached 1900 souls, but that number decreased to 1701 in 1881, owing to the ravages of the famine of 1878–79.

== Geography and etymology ==
The Kalubhar River, which rises in a kund or reservoir near Babra, used to formerly flow about two miles within Vala frontier. But it changed its course in late 19th century, and started flowing close to Chogath. The village derives its name from four small hills nearly adjoining it, called the Khodiar, Modlio, Bhutio and Dangardi.

== Places of interest ==
There is a shrine of Khodiyarmata on the Khodiar hill, the image in which is said to have been installed by the Gohil chieftains of Umrala. Two hills, called respectively the Thapnath and the Isavo, lie to the eastward of Chogath. On the Thapnath hill is a temple of the Thapnath Mahadev, which enjoyed an endowment made by Thakor Sarangji of Umrala. The celebrated sage, Dhundhali Mai, whose curse is said to have caused the destruction of Vala, the ancient Valabhipur, resided in a hut on the Isalvo hill.

Chogath is a flourishing village, and bears wheat crops of excellent quality which is raised by irrigation. The village is no doubt an ancient one, and was very near Vallabhipur, and though no architectural remains are now existent, large bricks, such as those found at Valabhi, are constantly dug up. There is an old paliya or memorial stone here, the inscription on which is illegible, but the date, Samvat 1516 (1460 AD), is plain enough.

== Economy ==
Excellent building stone is quarried from the hills lying to the north of the village.
