= Juna Vaghaniya =

Juna Vaghanya
- town
- Location in Amreli, Gujarat, India Juna Vaghanya (India)
- Coordinates: 21.583248°N 70.969775°E
- Country: India
- State: Gujarat
- District: Amreli

Government
  - Type: Municipal corporation
  - Body: Nagar Palika

Population (2001)
  - Total: 3,706

Languages
  - Official: Gujarati, Hindi, English
- Time zone: UTC+5:30 (IST)
- Vehicle registration: GJ 14
- Website: gujaratindia.com

Juna Vaghanya or Vaghaniya Juna is a town in Bagasara Taluka of Amreli district, Gujarat, India. The town is situated on the northern bank of the Satladi river.
