= Mota Bhamodra =

Village in Gujarat state, India

Mota Bhamodra is a village in Savarkundla Taluka of Amreli district, Gujarat, India.

== History ==
Formerly Bhamodra was known for its iron-works and the steel produced was famous in the neighbourhood for sword blades, which were styled as being of the Bhamodra ore.

Ancient coins are often found at Bhamodra; amongst these was one of Apollodotus I, besides others of the Western Satraps, Gupta, and Maitraka kings. To the south of the village is a large tank, of which, the northern bank alone has been built with masonry; it appears of some antiquity.

In this village, God Himself has come and completed the parcha.In a book called Sukhvilas.The name of Sukhram Bapu is very famous in this village.AD 18 was around.Ramdevpeer Maharaj himself is here in the village

== Places of interest ==
About two miles south of Bhamodra is a small cave containing linga of Mahadev called the Kedarnath. There is a small kund or reservoir near the cave called the Kedar Kund. In the month of Shraavana or August, a small fair is held here in honour of the Kedarnath Mahadev.

Mota bhamodra have one temple of Shri SukharamBapu, all villages are united due to this temple.
