= Bagasara taluka =

Taluka in Gujarat, India

- Taluka of Gujarat
- Interactive map of Bagasara taluka
- Coordinates: 21.483333°N 70.95°E
- Country: India
- State: Gujarat
- District: Amreli
- Headquarters: Bagasara

Population (2011)
  - Total: 83,054
  - Sex ratio: 956 ♂/♀
  - Literacy: 70.6%

Languages
  - Official: Gujarati, Hindi
- Time zone: UTC+5:30 (IST)
- Telephone code: +91-079
- Vehicle registration: GJ
- Website: amrelidp.gujarat.gov.in/en/taluka/Bagasara/home

Bagasara Taluka is a geographical subdivision located in the Amreli district of the state of Gujarat, India. It is situated in the western part of the country and falls within the Saurashtra region. Bagasara is the headquarters of the Taluka.

== History ==
During the medieval period, Bagasara Taluka became a part of the larger socio-political landscape of the Gujarat Sultanate. The strategic location of the region facilitated trade routes connecting the western coast to the hinterlands. The rise of various local rulers and dynasties further shaped the history of the taluka, leaving behind architectural remnants and cultural influences that are still palpable. Bagasara was conquered in about 1525 by Vala Mancha Bhaiya of Devgam Devli. Vala Mancha was succeeded by his son Bhaiya, from whom the Bagasara Kathis are called Bhaiyani. There are many Dawoodi Bohras in the city. During the British period, the town belonged to the Vala Kathis and is the seat of the Kathiawar Agency thana.

== Geography ==
Bagasara Taluka is a geographical subdivision located in the Amreli district of the Indian state of Gujarat. Situated within the western reaches of India, Bagasara Taluka is characterized by its diverse landscape, encompassing various natural features and landforms. Its geographical coordinates range approximately from 21.9706° N latitude to 71.7543° E longitude.

The taluka is characterized by its undulating terrain, which ranges from plains to low hills. The region's elevation varies, providing a panorama of valleys and plateaus interspersed with gentle slopes. This diverse topography plays a pivotal role in shaping the local climatic patterns and agricultural practices.

=== Climate ===
Climate data for Amreli (1981–2010, extremes 1973–2012)
Month	Jan	Feb	Mar	Apr	May	Jun	Jul	Aug	Sep	Oct	Nov	Dec	Year
Record high °C (°F)	36.6 (97.9)	39.0 (102.2)	43.6 (110.5)	45.6 (114.1)	46.2 (115.2)	45.6 (114.1)	39.1 (102.4)	38.6 (101.5)	40.1 (104.2)	42.1 (107.8)	38.2 (100.8)	36.6 (97.9)	46.2 (115.2)
Mean daily maximum °C (°F)	29.6 (85.3)	32.1 (89.8)	36.5 (97.7)	40.1 (104.2)	40.6 (105.1)	37.2 (99.0)	32.6 (90.7)	31.1 (88.0)	33.0 (91.4)	35.2 (95.4)	33.1 (91.6)	30.7 (87.3)	34.3 (93.7)
Mean daily minimum °C (°F)	11.5 (52.7)	14.0 (57.2)	18.7 (65.7)	22.6 (72.7)	25.2 (77.4)	26.3 (79.3)	25.1 (77.2)	24.2 (75.6)	23.2 (73.8)	21.0 (69.8)	16.5 (61.7)	12.7 (54.9)	20.1 (68.2)
Record low °C (°F)	1.6 (34.9)	3.5 (38.3)	9.1 (48.4)	14.1 (57.4)	18.0 (64.4)	20.6 (69.1)	21.4 (70.5)	21.1 (70.0)	18.1 (64.6)	14.4 (57.9)	9.1 (48.4)	4.1 (39.4)	1.6 (34.9)
Average rainfall mm (inches)	0.0 (0.0)	0.0 (0.0)	0.0 (0.0)	1.5 (0.06)	7.2 (0.28)	98.0 (3.86)	205.3 (8.08)	128.5 (5.06)	97.4 (3.83)	17.5 (0.69)	6.2 (0.24)	0.0 (0.0)	561.8 (22.12)
Average rainy days	0.0	0.0	0.0	0.1	0.7	4.2	8.9	7.0	4.3	1.0	0.4	0.0	26.6
Average relative humidity (%) (at 17:30 IST)	27	21	20	19	27	52	68	72	62	39	32	29	39
Source: India Meteorological Department

== Economy ==
Agriculture forms the major part of the economy in Bagasara Taluka. The fertile soil and adequate water resources foster the cultivation of a variety of crops, including groundnuts, cotton, millets, and pulses. The taluka is well known in gold plating.

== Administrative divisions ==
Bagsara taluka in Amreli district

There are 34 villages in this taluka and 34 gram panchayats are included.

- Adpur
- Bagasara
- Balapur
- Charan pipali
- Deri Pipaliya
- Ghantiyan
- Hadala
- Halariya
- Haliyad Juni
- Haliyad Navi
- Hamapur
- Hulariya
- Jamka
- Janjariya Juna
- Janjariya Nava
- Jethiavadar
- Kadaya
- Kagdad
- Khari
- Khijadiya
- Manekvada
- Mavjinjva
- Munjiasar Mota
- Munjiasar Nana
- Natvarnagar
- Pipaliya Nava
- Pithadiya
- Rafala
- Samadhiyala
- Sanaliya
- Shilana
- Vaghaniya Juna
- Vaghaniya Nava
