= Mansukh =

Mansukh (मनसुख) is an Indian masculine given name derived from a Sanskrit word meaning "happy heart". Notable people of this name include:

- Mansukh Bhuva, Indian politician
- Mansukh L. Mandaviya (born 1972), Indian politician
- Mansukh C. Wani (died 2020), Indian academic and organic chemist
