= Ambarish Der =

Indian politician

Member of Gujarat Legislative Assembly
- In office 2017–2022
- Constituency: Rajula

Working President of Gujarat Pradesh Congress Committee
- Incumbent
- Assumed office 9 July 2022 - 4 March 2024

Personal details
- Born: 20 December 1977 (age 48) varasda Amreli, Gujarat, India
- Party: BJP
- Spouse: Jignaben Der
- Parent: Jivabhai Der
- Profession: Businessman
- As of 18 November, 2022

Ambarishbhai Jivabhai Der is BJP politician from the state of Gujarat, India. He was a member of Gujarat Legislative Assembly elected from Rajula Assembly constituency. He was the working president of Gujarat Pradesh Congress Committee, before joining BJP in March 2024.
