= Amrutvel, Savarkundla =

Amrutvel is a village in Savarkundla Taluka of Amreli district, Gujarat, India. It is about six miles north-east of Savarkundla.

== History ==
The village is principally known for having been a possession of a certain Bukhari Syad named Anvar Shah. This Syad had in his employ a Sidi named Balal who became enamored of a beautiful Brahmin woman who was drawing water at the Nishania well, originally called Nakvasa; insulted her modesty, and on her husband remonstrating the Sidi killed him. The Brahmin female then became a sati and her paliyo or funeral monument stands to this day close to the village with the date Samvat 1042 (996 AD) on the tenth of the light half of Bhadarva, Saturday. But to avenge this cruel wrong the Juna Savar Valas attacked the village at night, and killed both the Sidi and the Syad, and burnt the village. Afterwards the Khumans repopulated the village in the fifteenth century and gave it the name of Amrutvel.
