= Ghandla =

Village in Gujarat state, India

Ghandla is one of the villages in Savarkundla taluka in Amreli district in Gujarat State, India.

== Location ==
Ghandla is located 25.6 km from Savarkundla, 54.6 km from Amreli and 262 km from Gandhinagar. Nearby villages are Bhakshi (3.1 km), Bhamar (3.5 km), Vanot (4.5 km), Dolti (4.8 km) and Chikhali (5.2 km). The nearest towns are Rajula (13.1 km), Khambha (17.8 km), Savarkundla (25.6 km) and Jafrabad (33.3 km).
