= Navi Mandaradi =

- Location in Gujarat, India
- Coordinates: 21.05°N 71.43°E
- Country: India
- State: Gujarat
- District: Amreli
- Founder: રાજા માંડવ
- Time zone: UTC+5:30 (IST)

Mandardi is a small village located in the state of Gujarat in India.

== Economy ==
In this village 90% people are connect with farm. Near this village is a small river, Dhatarwadi.

Shree Navi Mandaradi primary school. In this school standard are 1 to 7.

== Tourism ==
=== Temples ===
In this village are the following temples:

- Radha krishna mandir
- Ramji mandir (work in progress)
- Shivji mandir (work in progress)
- Hanumanji mandir
