= Lilia taluka =

Taluka in Gujarat, India

Lilia Taluka
- Taluka of Gujarat
- Country: India
- State: Gujarat
- District: Amreli
- Headquarters: Lilia

Population (2011)
  - Total: 60,423
  - Sex ratio: 980 ♂/♀
  - Literacy: 66.03%

Languages
  - Official: Gujarati, Hindi
- Time zone: UTC+5:30 (IST)
- Telephone code: +91-079
- Vehicle registration: GJ

Lilia Taluka is a geographical subdivision located in the Amreli district of the state of Gujarat, India. It is situated in the western part of the country and falls within the Saurashtra region. Lilia is the headquarters of the taluka.

== Demographics ==
According to 2011 Census, the Lilia Sub-district has a total of 12,358 households. The population of this sub-district stands at 60,423 individuals, comprising 30,520 males and 29,903 females. Among them, there are 6,072 children, with 3,222 being male and 2,850 female. In terms of demographics, the Scheduled Castes population in Lilia Sub-District is recorded at 5,452, consisting of 2,807 males and 2,645 females. Additionally, there are 256 individuals belonging to Scheduled Tribes, with 126 males and 130 females. Out of the total population, 40,051 individuals are literate, encompassing 22,386 males and 17,665 females. On the other hand, there are 20,372 individuals who are illiterate, with 8,134 being male and 12,238 female. there are 28,923 workers in Lilia Sub-District, including 18,926 males and 9,997 females. Conversely, there are 31,500 non-workers, with 11,594 males and 19,906 females.
