= Jaysukhbhai Kakadiya =

Indian politician

Jaysukhbhai Kakadiya (born 1 June 1964) is an Indian politician from Gujarat. He is a member of the Gujarat Legislative Assembly from Dhari Assembly constituency in Amreli district. He won the 2022 Gujarat Legislative Assembly election representing the Bharatiya Janata Party.

== Early life and education ==
Kakadiya was born in Chalala, Amreli district, Gujarat. He is the son of Vallbhabhai Kakadiya. He married Kokilaben Kakadiya. He completed his B.Com. in 1987 at KK Parekh Commerce College, Amreli which is affiliated with Saurashtra University.

== Career ==
Kakadiya won from Dhari Assembly constituency representing the Bharatiya Janata Party in the 2022 Gujarat Legislative Assembly election. He polled 46,466 votes and defeated his nearest rival, Kantibhai Satasiya of the Aam Aadmi Party, by a margin of 8,717 votes. He became an MLA for the first time winning the 2017 Gujarat Legislative Assembly election representing the Indian National Congress from Dhari seat. He defeated Dilip Sanghani of the BJP by a margin of 15,336 votes. Later, he shifted to the BJP and won the 2020 Gujarat Legislative Assembly by-election defeating Sureshbhai Manubhai Kotadiya of the Indian National Congress by a margin of 17,209 votes.
