= Untvad =

Village in Gujarat, India

- city
- Location in Gujarat, India Untvad (India)
- Coordinates: 21.92°N 71.22°E
- Country: India
- State: Gujarat
- District: Amreli

Languages
  - Official: Gujarati, Hindi
- Time zone: UTC+5:30 (IST)
- Vehicle registration: GJ-
- Website: gujaratindia.com

Untvad is a village near the Taluka headquarters Babra in Amreli district of Gujarat in the country of India. It is situated to the west of Babra and to the north of Amreli. The main road linking Chavand - Babra - Kotdapitha passes through Untvad. Bhurakhiya Hanuman Mandir Khodiyar Mandir are the major attractions accessible from here. Rajkot Airport and Lathi Railway Station serve Untvad.
