= Devrajiya =

- village
- Location in Gujarat, India
- Coordinates: 21.30°N 71.09°E
- Country: India
- State: Gujarat
- District: Amreli

Population (2011)
  - Total: 3,000
  - Density: 3,000/km^{2} (7,800/sq mi)

Languages
  - Official: Gujarati, Hindi
- Time zone: UTC+5:30 (IST)
- PIN: 02792
- Vehicle registration: GJ-14
- Nearest city: Amreli

Devrajiya is a village in the Amreli district of India. Devrajiya was under the control of the Amreli state during the Navabshahi.Local business mainly consists of agriculture and diamonds.

Chalala railway station is located 6 km from the main village.

== Geography ==
Chalala is located at 21.30°N 71.90°E. It has an average elevation of 160 metres (524 feet).

The nearby airports are at Ahmedabad, Bhavnagar and Rajkot.

== Demographics ==
As of 2001 India census, devrajiyaD had a population of 3215. Males constitute 51% of the population and females 49%. Devrajiya has an average literacy rate of 72%, higher than the national average of 59.5%; with male literacy of 76% and female literacy of 62%. 12% of the population is under 6 years of age.
