= Vasant Vijay =

Poem by Manishankar Ratnji Bhatt 'Kant'

- by Manishankar Ratnji Bhatt 'Kant'
- Original title: વસંતવિજય
- First published in: Purvalap (1923)
- Country: British India
- Language: Gujarati
- Form: Khandakavya
- Meter: various Sanskrit meters

Vasant Vijay (The Triumph of the Spring) is a narrative poem that was written by Indian poet Manishankar Ratnji Bhatt 'Kant' (1867–1923), who was popularly known as Kavi Kant.

== Summary ==
Vasant Vijay includes a reference to Pandu, the mythical father of the five Pandavas in the Indian epic poem Mahabharata. Vasant Vijay narrates an episode from the Adi Parva (The Book of the Beginning) of Mahabharata.

Pandu kills a mating deer, for which he is cursed to undergo a similar death. Pandu tries to get rid of the curse by observing celibacy but under the profound influence of spring, he loses his self-control and has sex with his wife Madri, who is hesitant, knowing its fatal consequence.

In Vasant Vijay, Kant narrates the episode in a dramatic manner in a classical, metrical style. The triumph of spring symbolises the triumph of lust and the destiny of the human predicament.

== Reception ==
According to Mansukhlal Jhaveri, Vasant Vijay, along with Kant's other poems Chakravak Mithuna and Devayani, is a remarkable example of the arts of Khandakavya that set up a standard of high poetical excellence in Gujarati. The poem is noted for its metrical pattern and the resulting sound effect, and for its emotional depth.
