= Chital, Gujarat =

Village in Gujarat, India

Coordinates: 21.7376148°N 71.1903762°E

Chital is a village in Amreli Taluka of Amreli district, Gujarat, India.

== Demographics ==
The population of Chital according to the census of 1872 was 3908 and according to that of 1881 3959 souls.
