= Gadhakda =

Gadhakda Gatagdu
- village
- Country: India
- State: Gujarat
- District: Amreli

Population
  - Total: 15,000

Languages
  - Official: Gujarati, Hindi
- Time zone: UTC+5:30 (IST)
- Vehicle registration: GJ-14
- Nearest city: Savarkundla, Mahuva
- Literacy: 50%
- Website: www.gujaratdentistry.com

Gadhakda is a village in Savarkundla tehsil in the Amreli district of Indian state Gujarat. Gadhakda was formerly under the control of Junagadh State. Although it is now a part of the Amreli district, it was once a part of the Bhavnagar district.

== History ==
History of Gadhakda village goes back 300 years. Gadhakda is located in Savarkundla tahsil of Amreli district. Before independence it was under the control of the Princely State of Junagadh. Later after the integration of Junagadh in India due to its geographical location, Gadhakda became a part of the Bhavnagar district and now for the past decade, Gadhakda has been incorporated into the administrative auspices of the Amreli district.

After 12:01 AM to close the main gate of village. Nowadays that main gate is not available. Gadhakda and near village Ramgadh are combine with Pakistan because, Gadhakda village in authority of Junagadh king. Gadhkda is near by Savarkundla Taluka.

== Demographics ==
The population of the village is around 15,000.

== Economy ==
Apart from agriculture, employment opportunities for people in the village are primarily in diamond polishing.

== Location ==
The Gadhakda railway station is located 3 km from the main village and falls on the Dhola - Mahuva railway line, in western zone of Indian Railways . This railway line was originally built in 1923 by Bhavnagar State Railway. Gadhakda is connected to Ramgadh, Likhala, Vijpadi, Badhada, Savarkundla, Jinjuda, Ganeshgadh and Kalyanpur by road. The nearest airport to Ghadhakda is Bagdana.

Though Kalyanpur is still a part of Gadhakada village, formally Ganeshgadh and Ramgadh was also a part of this village but after separate Gram Panchayat, both village are now not a part of Gadhakada

== Temples ==
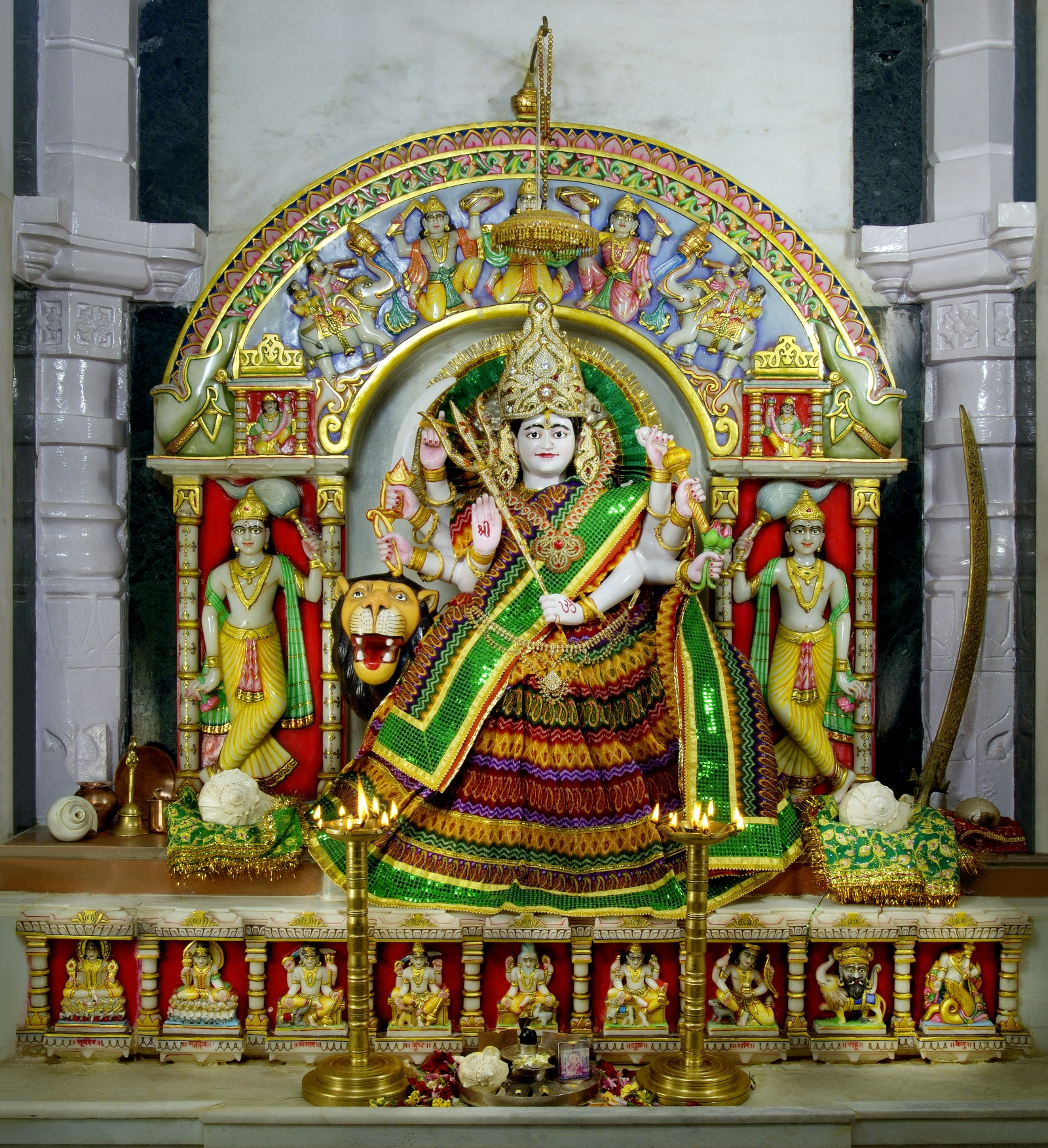
Image of Ashapura Mata in temple

The many Ashrams and temples located in the village are the main attractions. Temple of lord Shiva is located at the bank of the river Fulzer. Temple of Ashapura Mata is located in the center of the village.

Many Hanuman temples, ashrams and two Ramji Mandir, and other of Swaminarayan temples are also located in the village. Though the village is not highly developed, due to its interior location, it is the main village in Savarkundla Taluk and is surrounded in the midst of a picturesque natural environment.

== Education ==
Primary and secondary schools (providing education up to the 10th grade) are functioning in this village.
