= Rajula Assembly constituency =

Legislative Assembly constituency in Gujarat State, India

Coordinates: 21.04°N 71.45°E

Rajula
- Constituency No. 98 for the Gujarat Legislative Assembly

Constituency details
- Country: India
- Region: Western India
- State: Gujarat
- District: Amreli
- Lok Sabha constituency: Amreli
- Established: 1972
- Total electors: 274,855
- Reservation: None

Member of Legislative Assembly
- 15th Gujarat Legislative Assembly
- Incumbent Hirabhai Odhavjibhai Solanki
- Party: Bharatiya Janata Party
- Elected year: 2022

Rajula is one of the 182 Legislative Assembly constituencies of Gujarat state in India. It is part of Amreli district.

== List of segments ==
This assembly seat represents the following segments,

1. Rajula Taluka – Entire taluka except village – Rampara No-1
2. Jafrabad Taluka
3. Khambha Taluka (Part) Villages – Dedan, Raningpara, Nava Malaknes, Borala, Babarpur, Kantala, Chakrava, Hanumanpur, Juna Malaknes, Nesdi No-2, Samadhiyala No-2, Jivapar, Munjiyasar, Trakuda, Vangadhara, Talda, Dadli, Dhundhavana, Pachapachiya, Salva, Pipariya, Rabarika, Ambaliyala, Jamka, Ningala No-2, Bhundani, Gorana, Katarpara, Barman Mota, Barman Nana

== Members of Legislative Assembly ==
Year	Member	Party
2007	Bhargav Vaghmashi	Bharatiya Janata Party
2012	Bhargav Vaghmashi	Bharatiya Janata Party
2017	Ronit katariya	Indian National Congress
2022	Bhargav Baldaniya	Bharatiya Janata Party

== Election results ==
=== 2022 ===
Gujarat Assembly election, 2022: Rajula Assembly constituency
Party	Candidate	Votes	%	±%
BJP	Hirabhai Odhavjibhai Solanki	78,482	43.69	
INC	Ambarishkumar Jivabhai Der	68,019	37.87	
Independent	Karanbhai Baraiya	19,186	10.68	
AAP	Bharatkumar Baldaniya	5,294	2.95	
NOTA	None of the Above	2,829	1.57	
Majority			5.82	
Turnout				
Registered electors		270,043		
BJP gain from INC		Swing		

=== 2017 ===
2017 Gujarat Legislative Assembly election: Rajula
Party	Candidate	Votes	%	±%
INC	Ambarishbhai Der	83,818	50.85	
BJP	Hirabhai Solanki	71,099	43.14	
Majority		12,719	7.71	
Turnout		1,64,803		
INC hold		Swing		

=== 2012 ===
2012 Gujarat Legislative Assembly election: Rajula
Party	Candidate	Votes	%	±%
BJP	Hirabhai Solanki	75,447	50.65	
INC	Babubhai Ram	56,737	38.09	
Majority		18,710	12.56	
Turnout		1,48,961	12.56	
BJP hold		Swing		

== See also ==
- List of constituencies of Gujarat Legislative Assembly
- Gujarat Legislative Assembly
