= Bhatvadar =

Village in Gujarat state, India

Bhatvadar is a village in Lathi Taluka of Amreli district in Gujarat, India.

== History ==
During the British period, Bhatvadar was a separate tribute-paying taluka of the Babriavar district but it was later brought under Junagadh jurisdiction. It is about ten miles north of Jafarabad. The Grasias were Babrias of the Varu tribe. The population was 8 according to the census of 1872 and 46 according to that of 1881.
