= Bhada, Amreli district =

Village in Gujarat state, India

Coordinates: 20.8852°N 71.2263°E

Bhada is a village in Jafrabad Taluka of Amreli district, Gujarat, India.

== History ==
During the British period, Bhada was under Babariawad before being taken over by Junagadh jurisdiction. The Grasias are Babrias of the Varu subtribe.
