= Chavand =

Chavand may refer to:

- Chavand, Maharashtra
- Chavand, Rajasthan
- Chavand, Gujarat
