= Jabal, Amreli =

Jabal is a village of Savarkundla Taluka, Amreli district, Gujarat, in India. It is a small village that was formed by the ancestors of the Khuman Family.

The Surajwadi river which flows south to north during the monsoon season and after is the main attraction of the village. The population of the city is around 22,500, and its area is 2 km^{2}

== Geography ==
Jabal is situated on the southern Saurashtra plateau, and has a hilly terrain. The ground water table is very low. The water contains high level of TDS counts along with excess level of sodium and phosphate. The water extracted from the bore-wells is found to be very hot and salty.
