= Juna Savar =

- village
- Location in Gujarat, India Juna Savar (India)
- Coordinates: 21.4597°N 71.3893°E
- Country: India
- State: Gujarat
- District: Amreli

Languages
  - Official: Gujarati, Hindi
- Time zone: UTC+5:30 (IST)
- PIN: 364515
- Telephone code: 02845
- Vehicle registration: GJ-14

Juna Savar is a village in the Amreli district of Gujarat, India. The Shetrunji River helps this village a lot, but sometimes it floods the village during monsoons. Asiatic lions live near the village.

== Overview ==
The River Sentruji, which flows south to north during the monsoon season, is the main attraction of the city.

== Geography ==
Juna Savar is situated on southern Saurashtra plateau. It has a hilly terrain and the ground water table is very low. The water contains high level of TDS counts along with excess level of sodium and phosphate. The water extracted from the bore-wells is found to be very hot.

== History and culture ==
There is a temple of Goddess "Chamunda Maa" in Juna Savar which is made by Vallabhbhai Mohanbhai Jinjariya. He was the first man of his village to bring diamond business in his village. He moved to Surat in his early life and then started doing diamond business there.

== Education ==
Juna Savar has an average literacy rate.
