= Barvala-Baval =

Barvala-Baval Baval-Barvala
- Village
- Location in Gujarat, India
- Coordinates: 21.7253900°N 70.8328720°E
- Country: India
- State: Gujarat
- District: Amreli
- Taluka: Kunkavav

Government
  - Body: Gram Panchayat
  - Sarpanch: Ravjibhai Limbabhai Paghdal
- Elevation: 128 m (420 ft)

Population (2011)
  - Total: 2,585

Languages
  - Official: Gujarati
- Time zone: UTC+5:30 (IST)
- PIN: 365480
- Telephone code: 02796
- Vehicle registration: GJ 14

Barvala Baval is a small village in the Kunkavav Taluka of Amreli district of the Saurashtra region in the Indian state of Gujarat.

The village borders three districts; Amreli, Rajkot and Junagadh. It covers 8.75 km^{2}.

== Demographics ==
The population was 2,585 in 2011 census. Population Census Parameter Census Data Total Population 2585 Total No of Houses 562 Female Population % 48.4% (1251) Total Literacy rate % 74.2% (1917) Female Literacy rate 33.1% (855) Scheduled Tribes Population % 0.0% (1) Scheduled Caste Population % 19.5% (503) Working Population % 65.6% Child (0–6) Population by 2011 211 Girl Child (0–6) Population % by 2011 50.2% (106).

Barvala Baval's local language is Gujarati. The total population of the village is 2585 and number of houses are 562. Female Population is 48.4%. The village literacy rate is 74.2% and the female literacy rate is 33.1%.

1. Credit: www.censusindia.gov.in

== Administration ==
Pareshbhai Dhaduk serves as the Sarpanch of the Gram Panchayat (village civic body).

== Economy ==
The primary occupations are diamonds, embroidery, construction and agriculture.

Recently, one of the largest nationalized banks of Saurashtra, The Amreli Jilla Madhyasth Sahkari Bank Limited opened its 71st branch in Barvala-Baval.

== Education ==
There is a pay-centre primary school managed by the state government and the Shrimati M.L. Paghdal High School for secondary education.

== Religion ==
The majority population of the village follows Hinduism. Ramji Mandir is popular local temple. Dosapir Dargah is a religious place of the Muslim community. Gangadhar Mahadev Temple, dedicated to Shiva, is famous.

== Transport ==
The Vadiya-Devli Ancient Railway Station (Narrow Gauge) is nearby.

Barvala-Baval is situated 60 km from Amreli (headquarters), 5 km from Vadiya, 35 km from Gondal, 80 km from Rajkot, 25 km from Virpur and 28 km from Jetpur. Nearby villages include Bantva-Devli, Morvada, Khakhriya, Santhali, Khadkhad and Sultanpur. Barvala Baval is a village in Kunkavav-vadia Taluka in Amreli District of Gujarat State, India. It is located 49 km west from the District headquarters of Amreli and 294 km from the State capital Gandhinagar.

Barvala Baval's pin code is 365480 and its postal head office is Vadia.

Bhukhli-santhali (4 km), Bantwa-devli (4 km), Pipaliya Dhundhiya (5 km), Morvada (5 km), Khadkhad (6 km) are the nearby Villages to Barvala Baval. Barvala Baval is surrounded by Bhesan Taluka towards South, Jetpur Taluka towards west, Gondal Taluka towards North, Bagasara Taluka towards South.

Amreli, Junagadh, Upleta, Lathi are the nearby Cities to Barvala Baval.

Barvala-Bavl is located on the border of the Amreli District and Junagadh District. Junagadh district's Bhesan is located south.

== Politics in Barvala Baval ==
The BJP and the INC are the major political parties in this area.
