= Amreli Steels =

Pakistani steel rebar manufacturer

Amreli Steels Limited
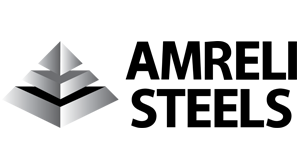
- Trade name: Amreli Steels Limited
- Formerly: Amreli Steels (Pvt) Ltd; Amreliwala Hardware Industries
- Type: Public
- Traded as: PSX: ASTL
- Industry: Steel
- Founded: 1972; 54 years ago
- Founder: Abbas Akberali
- Headquarters: Karachi, Pakistan
- Area served: Pakistan
- Key people: Shayan Akberali (CEO)
- Products: Rebar
- Revenue: ▼ Rs. 38.775 billion (US$140 million) (2024)
- Operating income: ▼ Rs. −130.787 million (US$−470,000) (2024)
- Net income: ▼ Rs. −6.106 billion (US$−22 million) (2024)
- Total assets: ▲ Rs. 46.839 billion (US$170 million) (2024)
- Total equity: ▼ Rs. 14.226 billion (US$51 million) (2024)
- Website: amrelisteels.com
- Footnotes; Financials as of 30 June 2024

Amreli Steels Limited (Urdu pronunciation: [əmˈreː.li stiːlz] um-RAY-lee STEELZ) is a Pakistani steel rebar manufacturer which has its headquarters in Karachi.

Amreli Steels is publicly listed on the Pakistan Stock Exchange.

== History ==
Amreli Steels was founded in 1972 by Abbas Akberali, and is named after Amreli District, Gujarat, India from where Akberali's ancestors migrated to Pakistan.

As of 2013, Amreli's production capacity was estimated to be 150,000 tonnes, which by 2017 had increased to 180,000 tonnes annually .

In 2018, Amreli established a new production facility in Dhabeji with a 400,000 tonnes capacity. A strategic goal of the firm has been to be the first Pakistani company to reach annual production of 1 million tonnes of rebar product.

Amreli transitioned from a private to public firm in 2015, when it was listed on the Pakistan Stock Exchange following an initial public offering in October 2015.

As of 2026, the firm's production capacity is estimated to be 600,000 tonnes, with two factories in the country (in Thatta and Karachi).
