= Balel Pipariya =

Balel Pipariya Balel Piparia
- Village
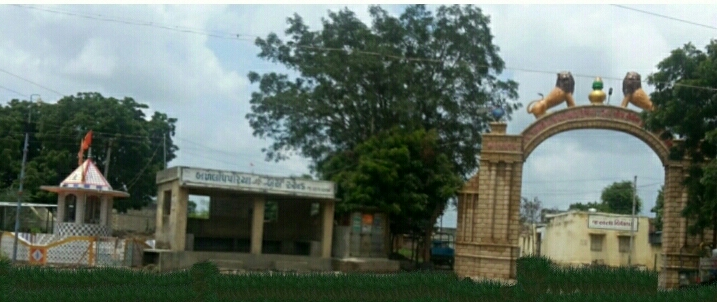
- Balel Pipariya Gate

- Location within Gujarat
- Coordinates: 21.75878°N 71.128601°E
- Country: India
- State: Gujarat
- District: Amreli

Government
  - Body: Balel Pipariya Gram Panchayt

Population (2011)
  - Total: 10,789

Languages
  - Official: Gujarati, Hindi, English
- Time zone: UTC+5:30 (IST)
- PIN: 365460
- Telephone code: 02791
- Vehicle registration: GJ-14
- Website: gujaratindia.com

Balel Pipariya is a City in the Amreli district, Gujarat, India.

== Demographics ==
As of 2011 India census Balel Pipariya had a population of 10,789. Males constitute 52% of the population and females 48%. Balel Pipariya has an average literacy rate of 70%, higher than the national average of 59.5%; with 56% of the males and 44% of females literate. 12% of the population is under 6 years of age.

- Around 10,000 Population in Balel Pipariya, 50% people live in outside of a like Surat, Ahmedabad & Mumbai, Rajkot

Balel Pipariya was famous for cotton farming.

== Population ==
Particulars	Total	Male	Female
Total No. of Houses		468	0
Population	2270	1,123	1,147
Child (0-6)	214	124	90
Schedule Caste	232	113	119
Schedule Tribe	0	0	0
Literacy	80.64%	86.89 %	74.74%
Total Workers	774	712	62
Main Worker	749	0	0
Marginal Worker	25	6	19

== Region ==
- Gajera

== Famous Palaces ==
- Aadhya Shakti Temple
- Khodiyar Temple
- Hiravav
- Swaminaray Temple
- રામજી મંદિર
- પીપળે શ્વરમહાદેવ
- કથીરીયા પરિવારના કુળદેવી નું મંદિર

== Famous People ==
- Bhagat Bapu
- Dayaram Bapu
