= Kavi Kant =

Manishankar Ratnji Bhatt
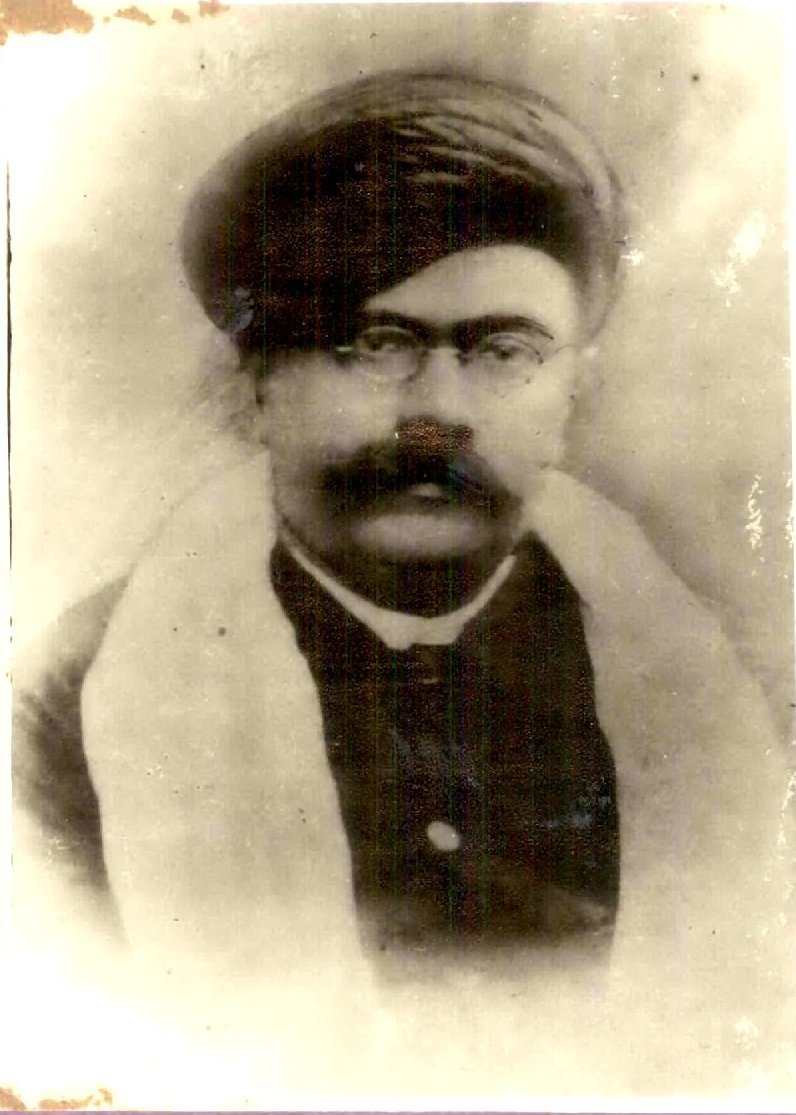
- Kavi Kant
- Born: 20 November 1867; Chavand, Baroda State, British India (now Amreli district, Gujarat, India)
- Died: 16 June 1923 (aged 55); Between Lahore and Rawalpindi on train, British India
- Education: Bachelor of Arts
- Alma mater: Bombay University
- Occupations: Poet; essayist; playwright
- Spouse: Narmada
- Writing career
- Pen name: Kant
- Language: Gujarati
- Notable work: Purvalap (1923)

Manishankar Ratnji Bhatt, popularly known as Kavi Kant was a Gujarati poet, playwright and essayist. He is an innovator of Khandkavya, a typical Gujarati poetic form and narration of one episode. His book Purvalap (1923) is a landmark in Gujarati poetry.

== Life ==
Kavi Kant was born in Prashnora Brahman Family on 20 November 1867 in Chavand, a village in Amreli Prant of Baroda state, to Motibahen and Ratnaji Bhatt. His family's influence left him with a deep interest in both education and philosophy. He was a student of both Hindu and Biblical philosophy. He took his primary education at Mangrol, Morbi and Rajkot. He completed his Bachelor of Arts in 1888 from Bombay University with Logic and Moral philosophy subjects. He served as a teacher at Surat in 1889. From 1890 to 1898, he served as Professor and then Vice principal at Kalabhavan, Vadodara. He was on tour to Kashmir in 1923. While returning to Lahore from Rawalpindi in train, he died en route on 16 June 1923.

=== Conversion ===
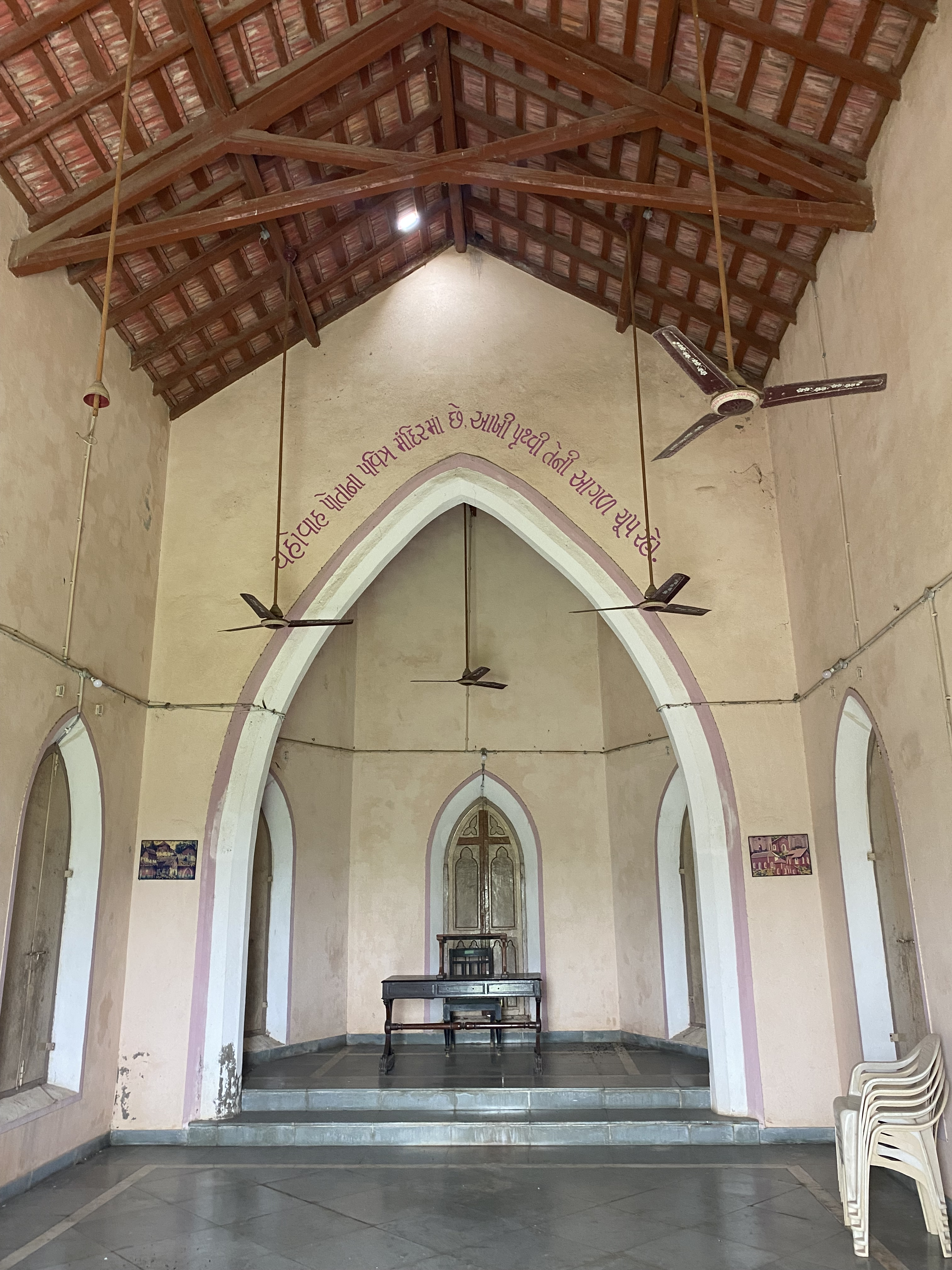
CNI Church in Ghogha where Kant converted to Christianity

In 1891 his first wife Narmada died. The death of his wife affected Kant deeply, and he could not find solace in his own religion. His search for answers about life and death led him to the philosophy of Emanuel Swedenborg. His writings provided some relief for his grief and he converted to Christianity in 1898. His family and friends opposed his decision and due to public and political opposition, he had to give up his position as minister of education in the Bhavnagar State. The community shunned both him and his family. Kant took the decision to leave the community and his family, for the sake of his wife and children. Realizing the repercussions of Kant's decision, the King of Bhavnagar along with some of his friends formed an "intervention" of sorts to ask him to change his mind. He realized that he could not stand to see his family suffer because of this decision. He missed them dearly and did not want to be apart from them.

== Literary work ==
He wrote one poetry book called Purvalap (1923) that was released on the day he died. He invented a form of poetry called "Khand-Kavya", one type of Narrative poetry, in Gujarati. He also wrote the plays Salimshah Athva Ashrumati, Roman-Swarajya, Dukhi Sansar and Guru Govindsinh between 1908 and 1914.
