= Chavand, Gujarat =

Chavand
- village
- Location in India
- Coordinates: 21.8098529°N 71.39728149999989°E
- Country: India
- State: Gujarat
- District: Amreli

Languages
  - Official: Gujarati, Hindi, English
- Time zone: UTC+5:30 (IST)
- PIN: 365 435
- Telephone code: 02791
- Vehicle registration: GJ-14

Chavand is a village in Lathi taluka in Amreli district, Gujarat, India. It is situated to the north of Amreli. The main road linking Rajkot and Bhavnagar and Amreli passes through Chavand.

== History ==
During the British period, it was originally under Babra village, was acquired by the Gaekwad during the government of the peninsula by Vithalrav Devaji.

== Demographics ==
The population according to the census of 1872 was 1280.

== Schools in and around Chavand ==
- Chavand Pay School And C R C Center
- Kankiya Maheta High School Chavand
- Hirana Bal Bhavan School
- Shree Vandaliya Prathamik School
