= Munjiyasar =

- village
- Location in Gujarat, India Munjiyasar (India)
- Coordinates: 21.0250354°N 71.2868982°E
- Country: India
- State: Gujarat
- District: Amreli

Languages
  - Official: Gujarati, Hindi
- Time zone: UTC+5:30 (IST)
- PIN: 365550
- Vehicle registration: People
- Website: gujaratindia.com

Munjiyasar is a village in Khambha Taluka in Amreli district of Gujarat State, India. It is located 76 kilometres (47 mi) south of the District headquarters Amreli, 8 kilometres (5.0 mi) from Khambha, and 329 kilometres (204 mi) from the State capital Gandhinagar.

Munjiyasar's Pin code is 365550 and the postal head office is Dedan.

Trakuda ( 3 km ), Dedan ( 3 km ), Samadhiyala No-2 ( 3 km ), Katarpara ( 4 km ), Gorana ( 4 km ) are the nearby Villages to Munjiyasar. Munjiyasar is surrounded by Jafrabad Taluka towards South, Rajula Taluka towards East, Una Taluka towards west, Saverkundla Taluka towards North .

Rajula, Una, Savarkundla, and Mahuva are the cities nearest to Munjiyasar.

Gujarati is the local language. Many of its people migrated to Surat city for diamond and textile jobs. In the village, the majority of the residents are farmers.

1.JIGS ફૌજી Munjiyasar

2.Magan bhai s makwana
