= Purvalap =

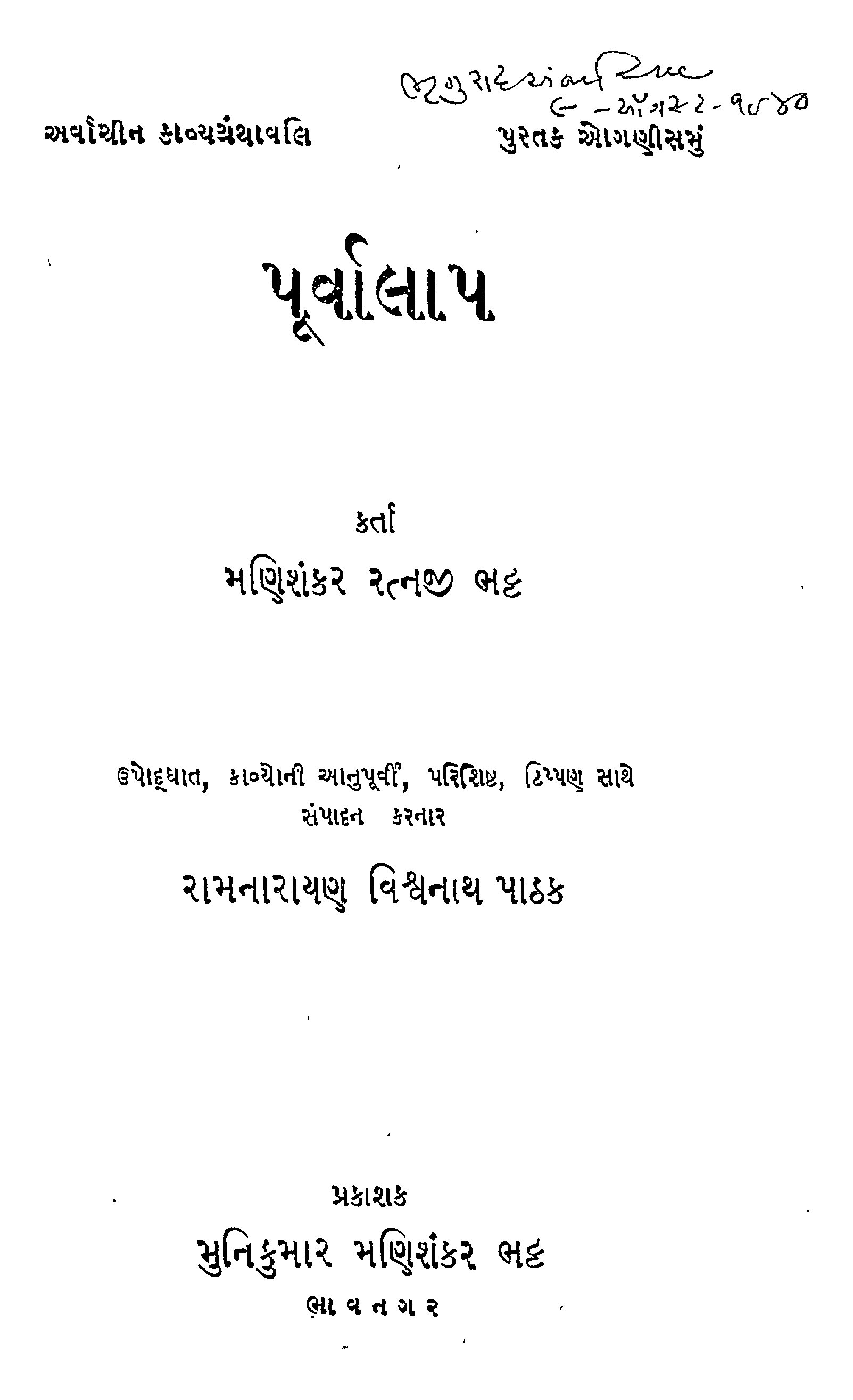
- title page of Purvalap
- Author: Manishankar Bhatt "Kant"
- Language: Gujarati
- Subject: tragedy of love and life
- Genre: Khandkavya (Narrative poetry), Sonnet
- Published: 1923
- Publisher: Munikumar Manishankar Bhatt
- Publication place: India
- Media type: Print
- OCLC: 22860996
- Dewey Decimal: 891.471
- LC Class: PK1859.B456 P8

Purvalap (Gujarati: પૂર્વાલાપ) is a posthumously published collection of poems by Manishankar Ratnji Bhatt alias Kavi Kant, in 1923. Kant has invented a new form of Khandkavya by blending the Greek and Sanskrit concepts of tragedy. Kant has given many literary significant poems by this work such as Vasant vijay, Chakravakmithun, Devyani and Sagar Ane Shashi.

== Content ==
The poems of this book mainly deals with the fusion of personal life and impersonal pursuit. The poem Vasant Vijay deals with a significant moment before Pandu's death. It deals with cursed Pandu's sexual desire with his wife Madri resulting in his death. Another poems namely Chakravakmithun is based on a popular myth of Chakravaks, the bird pair, doomed to be separated every evening. There are few more poems, such as Viprayoga, Manohar murti and Apni rat which express intensity of love for his wife.
