= Vadia, Gujarat =

Village in Amreli district, Gujarat, India

Vadia or Wadia is a census town in Amreli district in the Indian state of Gujarat. Vadia (Vadiya) is the small sub-Taluka category town of Amreli District. Vadiya and Kunkavav is now joint Taluka of Amreli. Vadiya is becoming well-developing town because of the good Governance of Suragvala before British rule. Vadia is situated 35 km.Tori is 12 km. from Vadia, south-east from Gondal, 25 km. east from Jetpur
