= Damnagar =

- Census town
- Location in Gujarat, India Damnagar (India)
- Coordinates: 21.7°N 71.52°E
- Country: India
- State: Gujarat
- District: Amreli
- Elevation: 136 m (446 ft)

Population (2001)
  - Total: 16,714

Languages
  - Official: Gujarati, Hindi
- Time zone: UTC+5:30 (IST)
- 365220: 365220
- Vehicle registration: GJ
- Website: gujaratindia.com

Damnagar is a census town in Amreli district in the state of Gujarat, India.

== Geography ==
Damnagar is located at 21.7°N 71.52°E. It has an average elevation of 136 metres (446 feet). There are many wells and irrigated fields around Dámnagar but there is no major river in the town.

== Demographics ==
As of 2001 India census, Damnagar had a population of 16,714. Males constitute 53% of the population and females 47%. Damnagar has an average literacy rate of 66%, higher than the national average of 59.5%: male literacy is 73% and, female literacy is 59%. In Damnagar, 14% of the population is under 6 years of age.there are many oil mils in past.

Kunbis and Kolis formed the major population.

== Temples ==
Damnagar has many temples. Kumbhnath and Vaijnath Temples in Damnagar are very peaceful and frequently visited by people from nearby villages. Kumbhnath temple located at the bank of a lake. the lake is huge near about 100 acres.

== Damnagar railway station ==
Damnagar railway station is situated on the outskirts of the town on a broad gauge line. Trains along the Dhola–Mahuva route through the station are operated using diesel engine locomotives.

== Swaminarayan Gurukul ==
Damangar has a large, spacious Swaminarayan temple and a boarding school in the outskirts of the village. Swaminarayan Gurukul is a temple-school and boarding complex with modern educational facilities.
