= Bhalia wheat =

Type of wheat

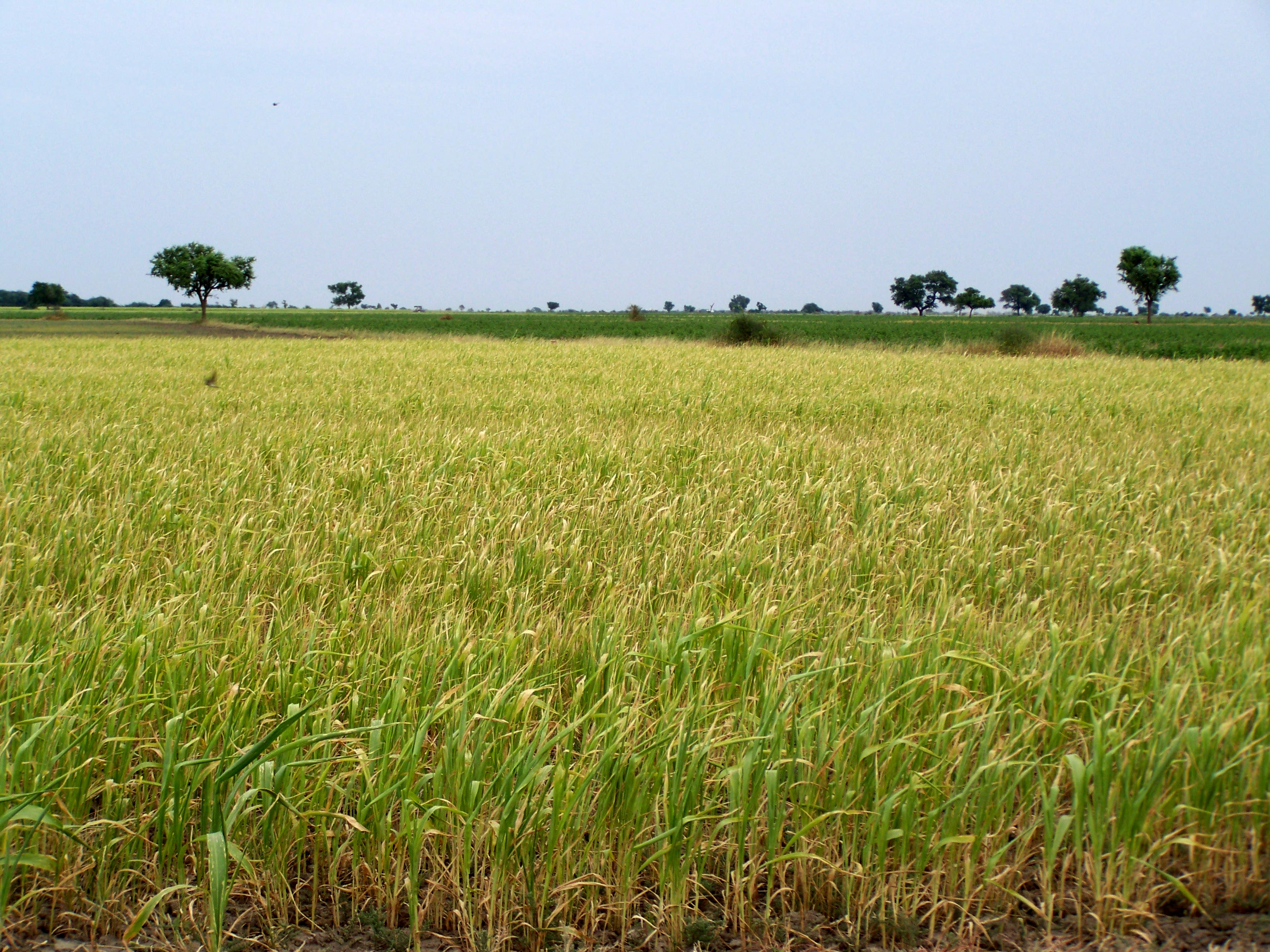
Farm of Bhal region with Bhalia Wheat crop.

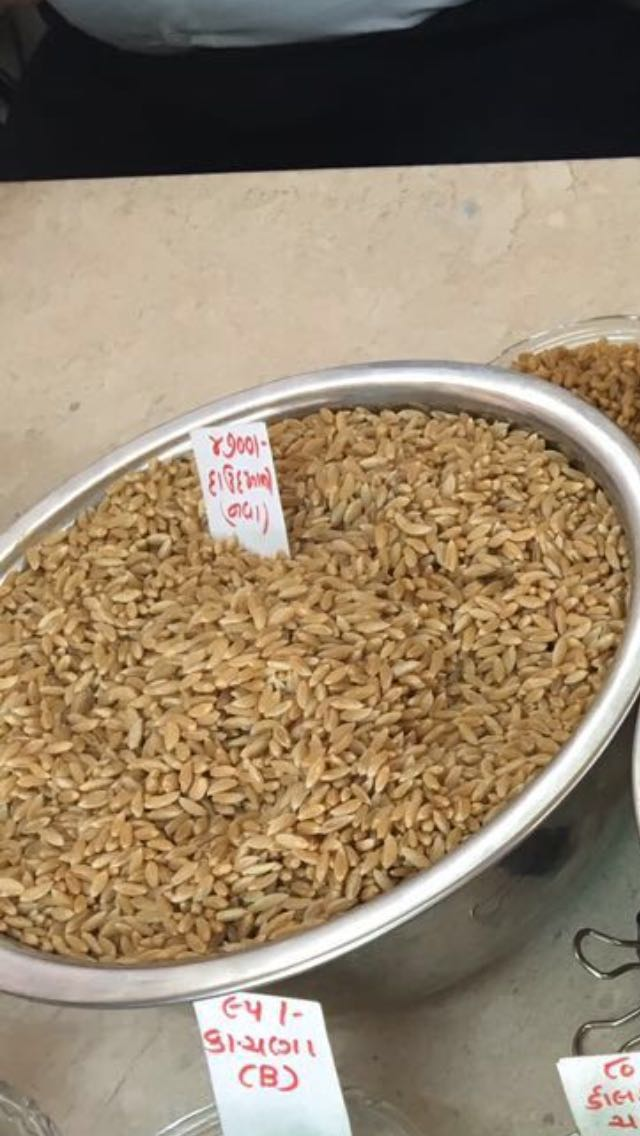
Bhalia Wheat in the market for sale.

Bhalia Wheat, also known as Daudkhani Wheat is a type of long grain Wheat cultivated in Bhal region in the north of Gulf of Khambhat, Gujarat, India. It received registration as Geographic Indication in 2011.

== Location ==
Bhal region is situated between Ahmedabad and Bhavnagar districts where this wheat are cultivated starting much before independence of India. They are widely cultivated in Dhandhuka, Dholka and Bavla talukas of Ahmedabad district; Limbdi of Surendranagar district; Vallabhipur of Bhavnagar district; Tarapur and Khambhat of Anand district; Matar of Kheda district; Jambusar and Vagra of Bharuch district.

Bhalia Wheat were registered as Geographic Indication in 2011 with help of state-run Gujarat Agro Industries Corporation and Anand Agricultural University. They are widely used for preparing semolina which is used for making pasta, macaroni, pizza, spaghetti, vermicelli, noodles etc. Gujarat Wheat-1, a variety of Bhalia Wheat, is popular in Gujarat.

== Production ==
The sowing starts in late October to the first week of November after rain water gets drained to the gulf. The produce is reaped in March — April. Every year 1.7 to 1.8 Lakh (170,000 to 180,000 long tons) of wheat is produced across 2 lakh hectares (490,000 acres). Bhalia wheat does not require irrigation or rain as they are cultivated on conserved soil moisture.

== Nutrition ==
Bhalia Wheat is rich in gluten, a type of amino acid. It is also rich in protein. It has high amount of carotene and has low absorption of water.
