= Dhari Assembly constituency =

Legislative Assembly constituency in Gujarat State, India

Coordinates: 21.33°N 71.03°E

Dhari
- Constituency No. 94 for the Gujarat Legislative Assembly

Constituency details
- Country: India
- Region: Western India
- State: Gujarat
- District: Amreli
- Lok Sabha constituency: Amreli
- Established: 1962
- Total electors: 223,141
- Reservation: None

Member of Legislative Assembly
- 15th Gujarat Legislative Assembly
- Incumbent Kakadiya Jaysukhbhai Vallabhbhai
- Party: Bharatiya Janata Party
- Elected year: 2022

Dhari is one of the 182 Legislative Assembly constituencies of Gujarat state in India. It is part of Amreli district, and is a segment of Amreli Lok Sabha constituency.

== List of segments ==
This assembly seat represents the following segments,

1. Dhari Taluka
2. Bagasara Taluka – Entire taluka except village – Kadaya
3. Khambha Taluka (Part) Villages – Samadhiyala Mota, Rugnathpur, Jikiyali, Vankiya, Kotda, Anida, Ingorala, Bhad, Visavadar, Dhari Nani, Lasa, Tantaniya, Umariya, Nanudi, Dadhiyali, Khambha, Pipalava, Gidardi, Dhavadiya, Bhaniya, Khadadhar, Bhavardi, Sarakadiya – Divana, Sarakadiya, Kodiya, Pati, Raydi

== Members of Vidhan Sabha ==
Election	Member	Party
1962	Premji Leuva	Indian National Congress
1967	Raghavji Leuva	Indian National Congress
1972	Raghavji Leuva	Indian National Congress
1975	Manubhai Kotadia	Indian National Congress
1980	Manubhai Kotadia	Indian National Congress
1985	Manubhai Kotadia	Indian National Congress
1990	Vajubhai Dhanak	Janata Dal
1995	Manubhai Kotadia	Indian National Congress
1998	Balubhai Tanti	Indian National Congress
2002	Balubhai Tanti	Bharatiya Janata Party
2007	Mansukh Bhuva	Bharatiya Janata Party
2012	Nalinbhai Kotadiya	Gujarat Parivartan Party
2017	Jaysukhbhai Kakadiya	Indian National Congress
2020 (By election)	Jaysukhbhai Kakadiya	Bharatiya Janata Party
2022	Jaysukhbhai Kakadiya	Bharatiya Janata Party

== Election results ==
=== 2022 ===
Gujarat Assembly election, 2022:Dhari Assembly constituency
Party	Candidate	Votes	%	±%
BJP	Jaysukhbhai Kakadiya	46,466	39	
AAP	Kantibhai Satasiya	37,749	31.68	
INC	Kirtikumar Kanubhai Borisagar	17,978	15.09	
Independent	Vala Upendrabhai Valkubhai	9,625	8.08	
NOTA	None of the above	1,845	1.55	
Majority		8,717	7.32	
Turnout				
Registered electors				

=== 2020 ===
Gujarat Legislative Assembly Election, 2017: Dhari
Party	Candidate	Votes	%	±%
BJP	J V Kakadiya			
INC				
NOTA	None of the Above			
Majority				
Turnout				
Registered electors				
BJP gain from INC		Swing		

=== 2017 ===
Gujarat Legislative Assembly Election, 2017: Dhari
Party	Candidate	Votes	%	±%
INC	J V Kakadiya			
BJP				
NOTA	None of the Above			
Majority				
Turnout				
Registered electors		211,917		

=== 2012 ===
Gujarat Assembly Election, 2012
Party	Candidate	Votes	%	±%
GPP	Nalinbhai Kotadiya	41,516	31.77	
INC	Kokilaben Kakadiya	39,941	30.56	
Majority		1,575	1.21	
Turnout		130,687	67.19	
Registered electors				
GPP gain from BJP		Swing		

=== 1995 ===
- Kotadia Manubhai Naranbhai (INC) : 25,455 votes
- Gajera, Himatbhai Haribhai (BJP) : 17,729

== See also ==
- List of constituencies of the Gujarat Legislative Assembly
- Gujarat Legislative Assembly
- Amreli district
