= Lilia, Gujarat =

Lilia
- Town
- Location in Gujarat, India Lilia (India)
- Coordinates: 21.1295327°N 71.2160756°E
- Country: India
- State: Gujarat
- District: Amreli

Population (2011)
  - Total: 10,359

Languages
  - Official: Gujarati, Hindi
- Time zone: UTC+5:30 (IST)
- Vehicle registration: GJ-14
- Website: gujaratindia.com

Lilia is the administrative headquarters of Lilia taluka in Amreli district of Saurashtra region in the western part of Gujarat, India.
