= Swaminarayan Gurukul =

Hindu religious and educational organization

Shree Swaminarayan Gurukul Rajkot Sansthan
- Abbreviation: Swaminarayan Gurukul
- Formation: 1948 (78 years ago)
- Founder: Shastriji Maharaj Shri Dharmajivandasji Swami
- Type: Religious organization
- Purpose: Educational, Philanthropic, Spirituality
- Headquarters: Rajkot, Gujarat, India
- Location: 60 centers
- Region served: Worldwide
- Leader: Guruvarya Shri Devkrushnadasji Swami
- Website: www.rajkotgurukul.org

Shree Swaminarayan Gurukul Rajkot Sansthan, commonly known as Rajkot Gurukul or Swaminarayan Gurukul, is a Hindu religious and educational organization with headquarters in Rajkot, Gujarat. The organization is within the Laxmi Narayan Dev Gadi of the Swaminarayan Sampraday.

The goal of the organization is to spread the Sadvidya (true education) that was championed by Bhagwan Swaminarayan. The organization also aims to teach Indian cultural heritage through branches around the world. Its major branches in India include Rajkot, Junagadh, Surat, Poicha (Nilkanthdham), Hyderabad, Taravada, Bangalore, Gulbarga, Ahmedabad, Bidar, Jadcherla, Mysore, Nagpur, NTPC Lara, Navi Mumbai, Secunderabad, Raipur, Solapur, Suryapet, Vidyanagar, Vijayawada. Its international branches include Dallas, Paramus (New Jersey), Corona, CA and Atlanta, all in the United States.

== History ==
Shastriji Maharaj Shri Dharmajivandasji Swami was inspired to found an educational institution after a pilgrimage to Badrinath (an abode of Badrinarayan on Himalaya) in 1946.

The organization was established in 1947 in Rajkot by Shastriji Maharaj with support from Pujya Purani Swami, Shree Premprakashdasji Swami, Pujya Mugat Swami, Shree Nitrannamuktadasji Swami, and Tribhuvan Gaurishankar Vyas. The organization started teaching on June 16, 1948, with seven students in a rented house in Rajkot. The foundation stone of Shree Swaminarayan Gurukul at Rajkot was laid on November 5, 1948.

In 1974, Shastriji Maharaj gave the administrative duties of the organization to its current leader, Guruvarya Shri Devkrushnadasji Swami.

In 2022 then Indian Prime minister Narendra Modi gave a virtual address at the Rajkot branch.

As of 2026, its school network, Shree Swaminarayan Gurukul International School (SGIS), operates 38 branches worldwide 20 in Gujarat, 17 across other Indian states, and one international residential campus in Jinja, Uganda. Major campuses include Rajkot, Ahmedabad, Surat, Junagadh, Vadodara, Bhavnagar, Jamnagar and Vidyanagar in Gujarat; Hyderabad, Bangalore, Mysore, Nagpur, Gurugram, Navi Mumbai, Raipur, Bhilai and Tirupati in other Indian states; and Jinja internationally.

== Academics ==
The word Gurukul is combination of two Sanskrit words: "Guru", meaning teacher or master, and "Kula" meaning 'abode'.

Swaminarayan Gurukul provides three types of education: Vidya (Modern Science), Sadvidya (Traditional Education), and Brahmvidya (Spiritual Education).

=== Vidya – modern education ===
Modern education (including science and technology) includes the aspects of knowledge, curiosity, creativity, leadership, and dynamism (adapting to the changes on the move).

=== Sadvidya – traditional education ===
Traditional education includes the values and ethics found in Indian culture and history. These values include:

- Integrity
- Empathy
- Non-violence: Valuing the life of every living organism.
- Gratefulness: Having an appreciation and being conscious towards God, saints, guardians, seniors, and natural resources.
- Freedom from awful propensities: refraining from insults, smoking, alcohol, drugs, enslavement, infidelity, gambling, etc.

=== Brahmavidya – spiritual education ===
Aspects of spiritual education include:

- Faith: including faith in the scriptures and obedience to divine rules and laws
- Devotion: includes reverential practices like chanting mantras, singing kirtans, prayer, and service (Seva) to God.
- Atmanistha: Realizing oneself as a simple Soul, confined from the body, as a humble Sevak of God
- Non-attachment: detaching oneself from materialistic objects and interests (wealth, popularity) to better focus on God.
- Realisation of God: Encountering God in reality.
- Affection with saintly persons: Having positive relationships with saints and devotees.

== Foundation ==
=== Aims & Objectives ===
To propagate and promote Bhagwan Shree Swaminarayan's Message

1. Building the best character of pupils through credible education.
2. Establish comprehensive development in every zone.
3. Prepare students to be the best patriots.
4. Creating secular harmony for all types of religions.
5. Equalize between modernity and spirituality.
