= Hanu Dhorajiya =

Indian politician

MLA of Gujarat
- In office 2007–2012
- Constituency: Lathi

Personal details
- Party: Bhartiya Janata Party

Hanu Dhorajiya is a MLA from Lathi constituency in Gujarat for its 12th legislative assembly.
