= Dharmajivandasji Swami =

- Shastriji Maharaj Shri Dharmajivandasji Swami

Personal life
- Born: Arjan Lakhani; 18 June 1901 Taravada, Amreli, Gujarat, India
- Died: 5 February 1988 Rajkot, Gujarat, India
- Honors: Shastri (Scholar), Sadvidya Saddharma Rakshak

Religious life
- Religion: Hinduism
- Denomination: Swaminarayan Sampraday
- Founder of: Shree Swaminarayan Gurukul Rajkot

Religious career
- Teacher: Shri Gopinathdasji swami
- Successor: Guruvarya Shri Devkrushnadasji Swami Guruvarya Shri madhavpriydasji Swami

Dharmajivandasji Swami (18 June 1901 – 5 February 1988), commonly known as Shastriji Maharaj, was a Hindu saint, social worker and founder of the Shree Swaminarayan Gurukul Rajkot Sansthan. During his lifetime, he established branches of Swaminarayan Gurukul in Rajkot, Junagadh and Ahmedabad. Since he died, his followers have expanded the Shree Swaminarayan Gurukul Rajkot Sansthan all across India and around the world. Some of its main branches in India include Rajkot, Ahmedabad, Junagadh, Surat, SGVP Chharodi, Poicha (Nilkanthdham), Hyderabad, Taravada, and Bangalore. Its international branches include Dallas (Texas, USA), Paramus (New Jersey, USA), and Atlanta (Georgia, USA).
