= Mansukh Bhuva =

Indian politician

MLA of Gujarat
- In office 2007–2012
- Constituency: Dhari

Personal details
- Party: Bhartiya Janata Party

Mansukh Bhuva is a Member of Legislative assembly from Dhari constituency in Gujarat for its 12th legislative assembly.
