= Savarkundla =

Savarkundla Savar Kundla
- City
- Savarkundla
- Location in Gujarat, India
- Coordinates: 21.337°N 71.310°E
- Country: India
- State: Gujarat
- District: Amreli

Government
  - Body: Savarkundla Nagarpalika

Area
  - Total: 8 km^{2} (3.1 sq mi)
- Elevation: 141 m (463 ft)

Population (2011)
  - Total: 78,354
  - Estimate (2021): 83,720
  - Density: 9,800/km^{2} (25,000/sq mi)

Languages
  - Official: Gujarati, Hindi
- Time zone: UTC+5:30 (IST)
- PIN: 364515
- Telephone code: 02845
- Vehicle registration: GJ-14

Savarkundla (sometimes stylised as Savar Kundla) is a city and a municipality in Amreli district in the Indian state of Gujarat. It is a twin city formed when the cities of Savar and Kundla merged.

== Demographics ==
According to the 2011 census, Savarkundla had a population of 78,354. Males constituted 52% of the population and females 48%. 11% of the population was under 6 years of age.

== Geography ==
Savarkundla is situated on the southern Saurashtra plateau. It is an area of hilly terrain. Ground water table is very low. The water contains a high level of total dissolved solids along with excess levels of sodium and phosphate. The water extracted from bore-wells is hot. The Navli river flows from south to north during the monsoon season. Moreover, this river flows exactly from the between of this town and thus dividing it in two parts: Savar and Kundla. Kundla is western bank of Navli and Savar lies on eastern bank.

== Economy ==
Savarkundla is widely known for its weighing scale industry, which engages approximately one-third of the town's population. The city is a leading manufacturer of mechanical weighing scales in India and is increasingly emerging as a hub for the assembly of electronic weighing scales. In addition to this specialized industry, the surrounding district's economy relies on agriculture, particularly Kesar mango cultivation, dairy farming, and the adoption of modern farm mechanization techniques.

== Culture ==
Savarkundla celebrates major festivals including Navratri, Ganesh Chaturthi, Janmashtami and Diwali.

A distinctive local tradition during Diwali is Ingoriya ni Ladai, in which residents of the historically separate areas of Savar and Kundla gather for a symbolic contest. Ingoriya refers to the fruits of Ingor tree (Balanites roxburghii) and Ladai translates to fight in Gujarati. The seeds of dried Ingoriya fruits have an extremely hard woody shell and are soft on the inside. These seeds are hollowed out and filled with gunpowder or similar pyrotechnic compositions. These crude handmade "Ingoriya fireworks" are then lit up by rival parties and thrown at each other on the riverfront or designated venues as part of the celebration. This mock fight is part of festivities and not an actual fight of animosity. This long-standing custom is considered an important part of the town's cultural heritage and is observed with great enthusiasm by locals and visitors alike.

== Villages ==
- Amrutvel
- Gadhakda
- Ghandla
- Jabal
- Mota Bhamodra

== Notable people ==
- Morarji Desai – Former Prime Minister of India; attended primary school in Savarkundla.
- Manhar Udhas – Singer and ghazal artist; born in Savarkundla.
- Ratilal Borisagar – Gujarati writer and humorist; born and educated in Savarkundla.
