= Chalala =

- Town
- Location in Gujarat, India Chalala (India)
- Coordinates: 21.42°N 71.17°E
- Country: India
- State: Gujarat
- District: Amreli
- Elevation: 160 m (520 ft)

Population (2011)
  - Total: 16,721

Languages
  - Official: Gujarati
- Time zone: UTC+5:30 (IST)
- Postal code: 365630
- Vehicle registration: GJ-14
- Website: gujaratindia.com

Chalala is a town and a municipality in Amreli district in the state of Gujarat, India.

== Geography ==
Chalala is located at 21.42°N 71.17°E. It has an average elevation of 160 metres (524 feet).

== Demographics ==
As of 2011 India Chalala had a population of 16,721, of which 8,561 are males while 8,160 are females as per report released by Census India 2011. Literacy rate of Chalala city is 80.11%, higher than state average of 78.03%. In Chalala, Male literacy is around 86.68% while female literacy rate is 73.28%. Population of Children with age of 0-6 is 1738 which is 10.39% of total population of Chalala.

== Notable people ==
Apa Dana or Dana Bhagat is a locally well known saint.

== Transport ==
The nearby airports are at Amreli, Ahmedabad, Bhavnagar and Rajkot.

== In popular culture ==
The film Last Film Show was set in Chalala.
