= Kalubhar River =

Coordinates: 21°44′28″N 72°15′24″E

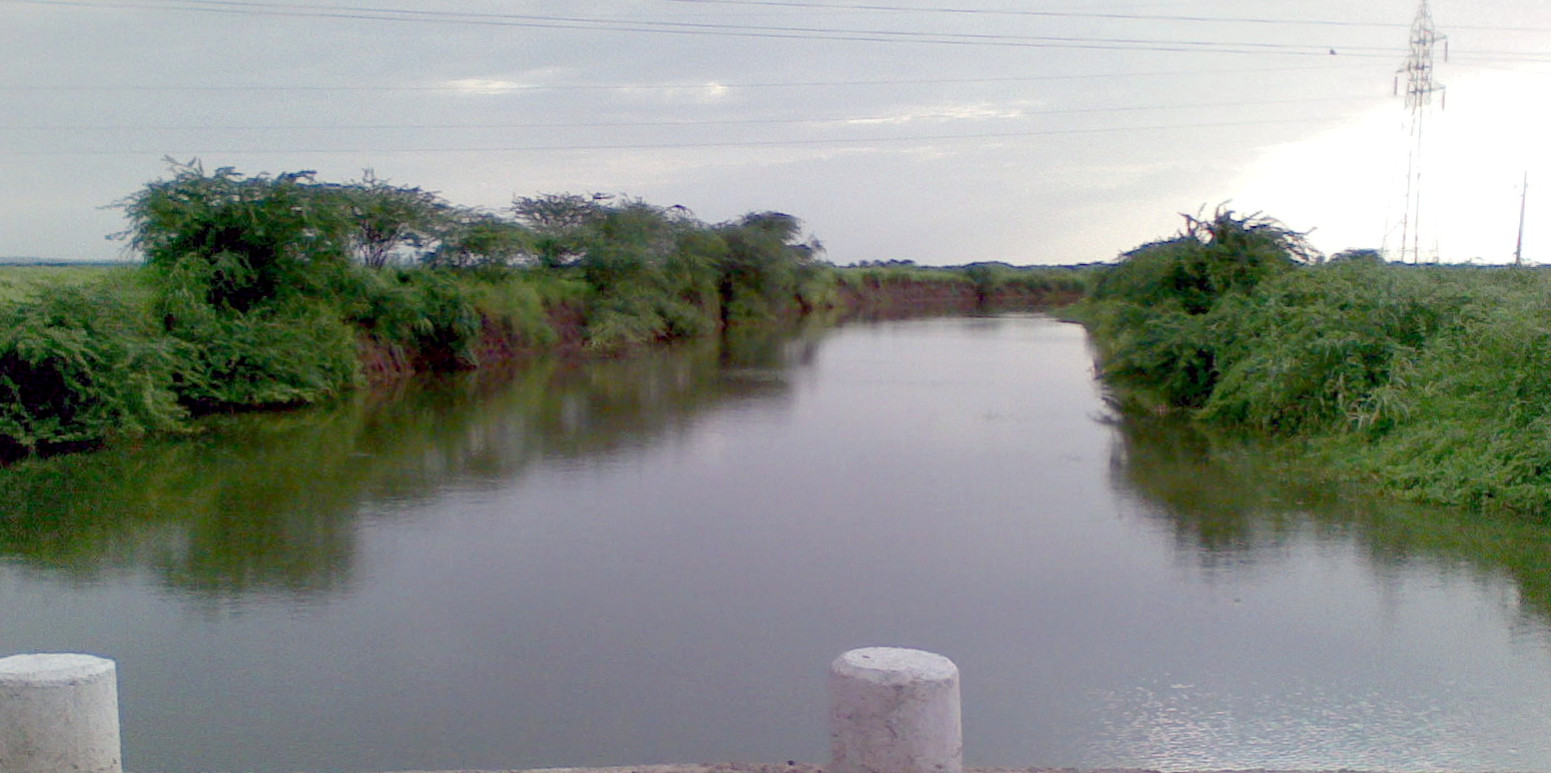

Location
- Country: India
- State: Gujarat
- Region: Saurashtra
- District: Amreli district, Bhavnagar district
- City: Babra

Physical characteristics
- Source
  - location: Babra, Amreli district, Gujarat, India
- Mouth
  - location: Gulf of Khambhat, Arabian Sea
- Length: 94 km (58 mi)
- Discharge
  - location: Arabian Sea

Kalubhar River is a river on the Kathiawar peninsula in the western India state of Gujarat. Kalubhar river originates near Chamardi Village near Babra and meets Gulf of Khambhat. Its length is 94 km. Kalubhar Dam is situated on this river having 667 km^{2}. The total catchment area of the basin is 1,965 square kilometres (759 sq mi).
