= Bagasara =

- Location in Amreli, Gujarat, India Bagasara (India)
- Coordinates: 21.483333°N 70.95°E
- Country: India
- State: Gujarat
- District: Amreli

Population (2001)
  - Total: 31,789

Languages
  - Official: Gujarati
- Time zone: UTC+5:30 (IST)
- Postal code: 365440
- Vehicle registration: GJ 14
- Website: gujaratindia.com

Bagasara is a municipality in Bagasara Taluka of Amreli district, Gujarat, India. The town is situated on the northern bank of the Satalli river. The nearest airport is Diu Airport (54 km).

== History ==
Bagasara was conquered in about 1525 by Vala Mancha Bhaiya of Devgam Devli. Vala Mancha was succeeded by his son Bhaiya, from whom the Bagasara Kathis are called Bhaiyani. There are many dawoodi bohras in the city. During British period, the town belonged to the Vala Kathis and is the seat of Kathiawar Agency thana.

== Demographics ==
As of 2001 India census, Bagasara had a population of 31,789. Males constitute 52% of the population and females 48%. Bagasara has an average literacy rate of 70%, higher than the national average of 59.5%; with 56% of the males and 44% of females literate. 12% of the population is under 6 years of age.

== Economy ==
Bagasara is known for its imitation gold plated jewellery and Ari Bharat embroidery clothes. Square sheets chophaal, and women's scarves sadla, of native manufacture, are made here. There is a market for Gir timber.

== Schools ==
There is a school founded by independence activist Lalchand Vora in 1931. In 1986, a very famous school started with the name Smt K.G.Dhanak Vidyamandir, near station road bagasara In 2016 New Science Private School named Sawstik public school started. There is popular school named Rashtriya Shayar Shree Zaverchand Meghani High School. It has Science, Commerce and Arts faculty.

== Colleges ==
Bagasara also has a college named Dhanak College. It is a commerce college.

== Places of interest ==
Bagasra main Temples

- Shree Swaminarayan Temple, Kukavav Road, Bagasara
- Shree Bageshwar Mahadev Mandir Amarpara, Bagasara
- MOTI HAVELI -Shri madanmohanji ni moti haveli. It is a haveli of Shuddhadvaita pushtimarg founded by jagadguru shri vallabhacharya mahaprabhuji.

Current gadi pati of haveli is HH goswami shri 108 shri prabhuji maharajshri of surat.

- Vraj Kashi Dhaam, Raghunath Mahadev Temple C/o Daughters and Sons of Late Shri. Vrajlal Ramji. Anadkat (Notable Grain-Merchant). Temple constructed with gathered funds of six daughters and three brothers.
- Ratneshwer mahadev mandir
- Bhutnath Mahadev Temple
- Munjiyasar Dam
- Jay gopal pushtimargiya Haveli.
- Hanumanji Temple (Charan Pipali)
- Atalji garden.
- Pujay Shree Aapagiga ni jagya
- Gayatri temple
- Mantreshvar Mahadev Mandir (near Munjiyasar Dam)
- Khodiyar Mataji Temple (Munjiyasar Dam)
- Shree Siyaram Gausala (Gokulpara, near riverbank)
- Kailashdham (Rafala)
- Shree Dev Balad Aashram (Rafala).

Main Masjids

- Jumma Masjid
- Nagina Masjid
- Arabvad Masjid
- Alisha Peer Dargah
- Hazarat Haji Hamidullahsha Peer urge Dangiya Peer bapu

Hazarat Ingarsha Peer.
