= Kunkavav Vadia Taluka =

Taluka in Gujarat, India

- Taluka of Gujarat
- Interactive map of Kunkavav Vadia Taluka
- Coordinates: 21.6995°N 70.9449°E
- Country: India
- State: Gujarat
- District: Amreli
- Headquarters: Wadia

Population (2011)
  - Total: 99,794
  - Sex ratio: 979 ♂/♀
  - Literacy: 76.84%

Languages
  - Official: Gujarati, Hindi
- Time zone: UTC+5:30 (IST)
- Telephone code: +91-079
- Vehicle registration: GJ

Kunkavav Vadia Taluka is a geographical subdivision located in the Amreli district of the state of Gujarat, India. It is situated in the western part of the country and falls within the Saurashtra region. Wadia is the headquarters of the taluka.

== Demographics ==
According to 2011 Census, the Kunkavav Vadia Sub-District, has 20,808 households accommodating a population of 99,794 individuals. The demographic distribution includes 50,438 males and 49,356 females. The child population is recorded at 9,493, comprising 5,203 males and 4,290 females. Socially, the sub-district is composed of 13,487 individuals from Scheduled Castes (6,916 males and 6,571 females) and 956 individuals from Scheduled Tribes (497 males and 459 females). In terms of education, 69,385 individuals are reported as literate, with 38,016 males and 31,369 females, while 30,409 individuals are categorized as illiterate, including 12,422 males and 17,987 females. In the economic sphere, 50,121 individuals are engaged in various forms of work, with 31,233 males and 18,888 females. Conversely, 49,673 individuals fall under the non-worker category, comprising 19,205 males and 30,468 females.
