= Jafrabad =

- town
- Location in Gujarat, India Jafrabad (India)
- Coordinates: 20.8667°N 71.3667°E
- Country: India
- State: Gujarat
- District: Amreli

Population (2001)
  - Total: 25,081

Languages
  - Official: Gujarati, Hindi
- Time zone: UTC+5:30 (IST)
- Vehicle registration: GJ
- Website: gujaratindia.com

Jafrabad is a town and a nagarpalika in Amreli District in the Indian state of Gujarat.

== Demographics ==
As of 2011 India census, Jafrabad had a population of 27,167 of which 13,737 were males and 13,430 were females. Jafrabad has an average literacy rate of 67.10%, lower than the state average of 78.03%: male literacy is 77.42% and female literacy is 56.58%. In Jafrabad, 12.42% of the population is under six years of age.

== History ==
During the British Raj era, Jafarabad State was a princely state governed by a dynasty of Siddis. It was united with Janjira State by treaty since 1759.

== Economy ==
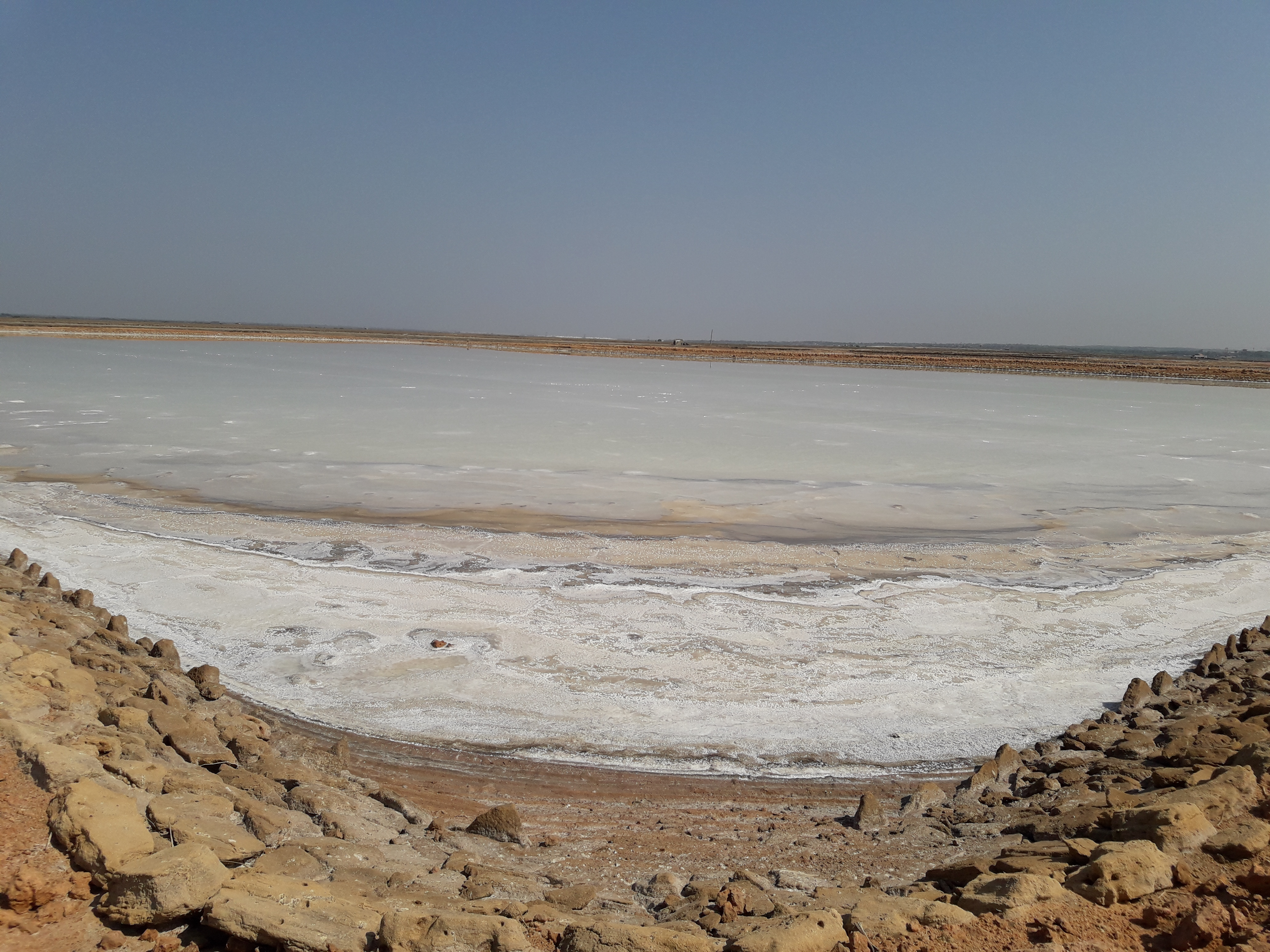
Salt pans at Jafrabad

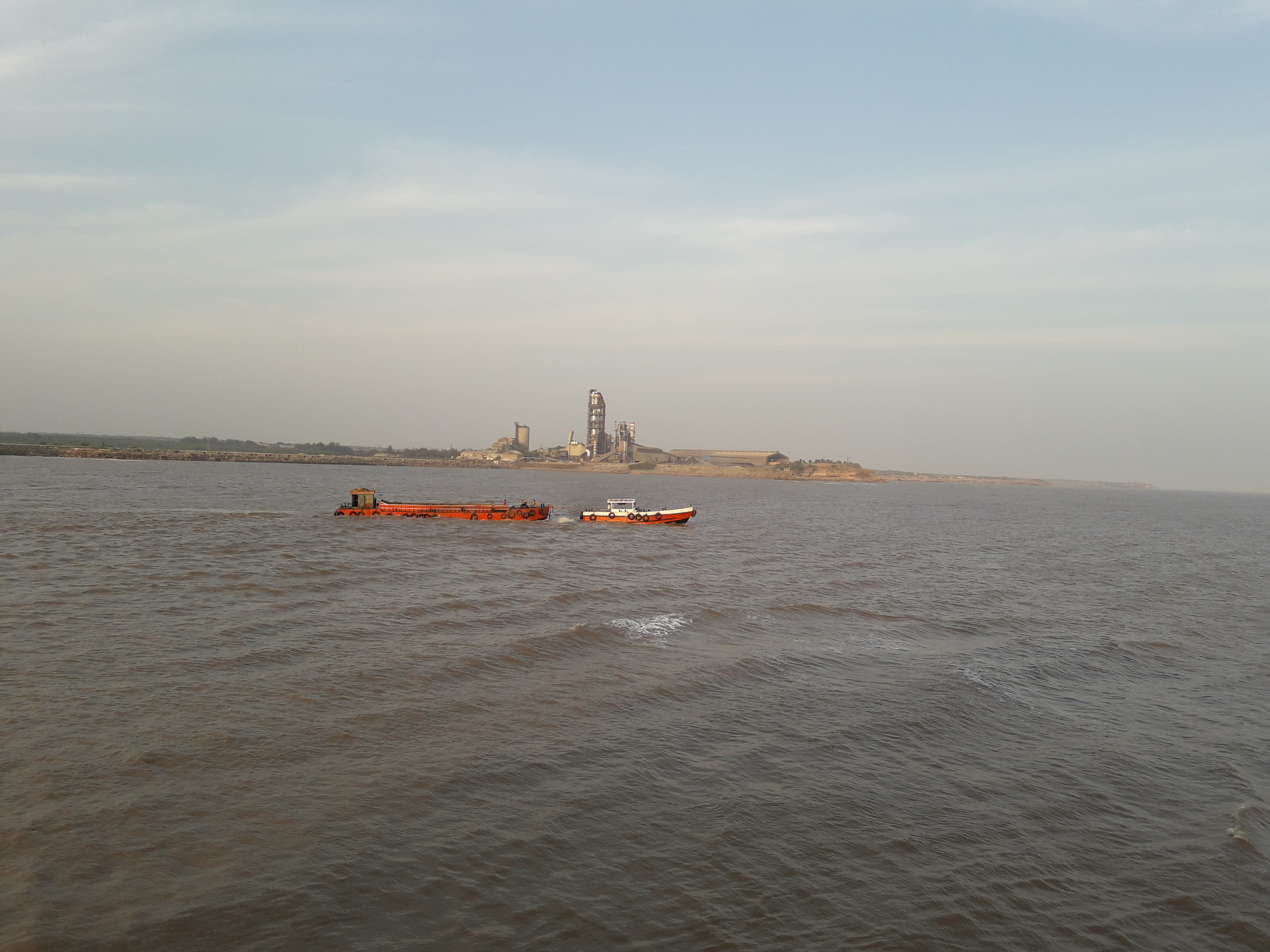
Ultra Tech Cement plant at Jafrabad

Jafrabad is a coastal town. Majority of population rely on fishing. Some people work in salt pans located on the coast.

Naramada Cement Works (a subsidiary of UltraTech Cement) is located nearby which provides employment to local population.

== Education ==
Ultra Tech Secondary and Higher Secondary School, is an English medium school operated by Ultra Tech Cement provide education to local population. Parekh & Mehta High school high Secondary school Gujarati medium school operated by semi government & Trust provided education to most local population.

"Kadiyali Secondary and higher secondary school" is located near Kadiyali village about 8 km from Jafrabad. Students from nearby villages like Dholadri, Balana, Chitrasar, Ghespur etc comes for higher education. Students from this school have even reached to District and State level competition in different categories like Science fair, Sports (Kabbadi, Kho-kho).
