= Babra, Gujarat =

Babra
- Town
- Location in India
- Coordinates: 21.8441667°N 71.3041667°E
- Country: India
- State: Gujarat
- District: Amreli

Government
  - Body: Babra Municipality

Population (2011)
  - Total: 25,270

Languages
  - Official: Gujarati, Hindi, English
- Time zone: UTC+5:30 (IST)
- PIN: 365 421
- Telephone code: 02791
- Vehicle registration: GJ-14
- Website: gujaratindia.com

Babra is a town and the taluka headquarter in the Amreli district, Gujarat, India. It is situated to the north of Amreli. The main road linking Rajkot and Bhavnagar and Amreli passes through Babra.

== History ==
Babra is said to have been the capital of Babruvahana, the son of Arjuna, one of the five Pandavas. Babhruvahana's Kund (stepwell) also known as Panch Kund is still here, and the Kalubhar River has its source there. It was the seat of Kathiawar Agency thana during British period. Babra was held by the Dafada Kathis.

== Demographics ==
The Babra Municipality has population of 25,270 of which 13,208 are males while 12,062 are females as per report released by Census India 2011.

The population of children aged 0-6 is 3159 which is 12.50% of total population of Babra. In Babra Municipality, the female sex ratio is 913 against state average of 919. Moreover, the child sex ratio in Babra is around 847 compared to Gujarat state average of 890. The literacy rate of Babra city is 76.72% lower than state average of 78.03%. In Babra, male literacy is around 82.21% while the female literacy rate is 70.77%.

== Administration ==
Babra is a Municipality city. Babra city is divided into 7 wards for which elections are held every 5 years. Babra Municipality has total administration over 5,022 houses to which it supplies basic amenities like water and sewerage. It is also authorized to build roads within Municipality limits and impose taxes on properties coming under its jurisdiction.

== Places of Attractions ==
- Nilkanth Mahadev Mandir
- Babhruvahana's Kund or Panch Kund
- Meldi Mata Temple
- Balmukund Lalji Haveli (Dharai),
- Randal Mata Temple (Dadva)
- Clangourous Stone of Kariyana
- Bhurakhiya Hanuman Mandir
- Tapadiya Ashram
- Saat Hanuman (limbadiya)
- Ridheshwar Mahadev Temple
- Balkrushna Lalji Haveli (Babra)
- Jalaram Mandir
- Nilkanth Mahadev Mandir
- Kalubhar Dam Kariyana
- Bhangadshapeer dargah
- Shaheed Chowk (Babra)

== Connectivity ==
Rajkot Airport and the Amreli Railway Station serve Babra. Babra is about 33 km from the Amreli railway station. Babra is about 78 km from the Rajkot Airport. Babra is situated on the Rajkot-Bhavnagar main road.

== See also ==
- Untvad

Nadala
