= Amreli district =

- District
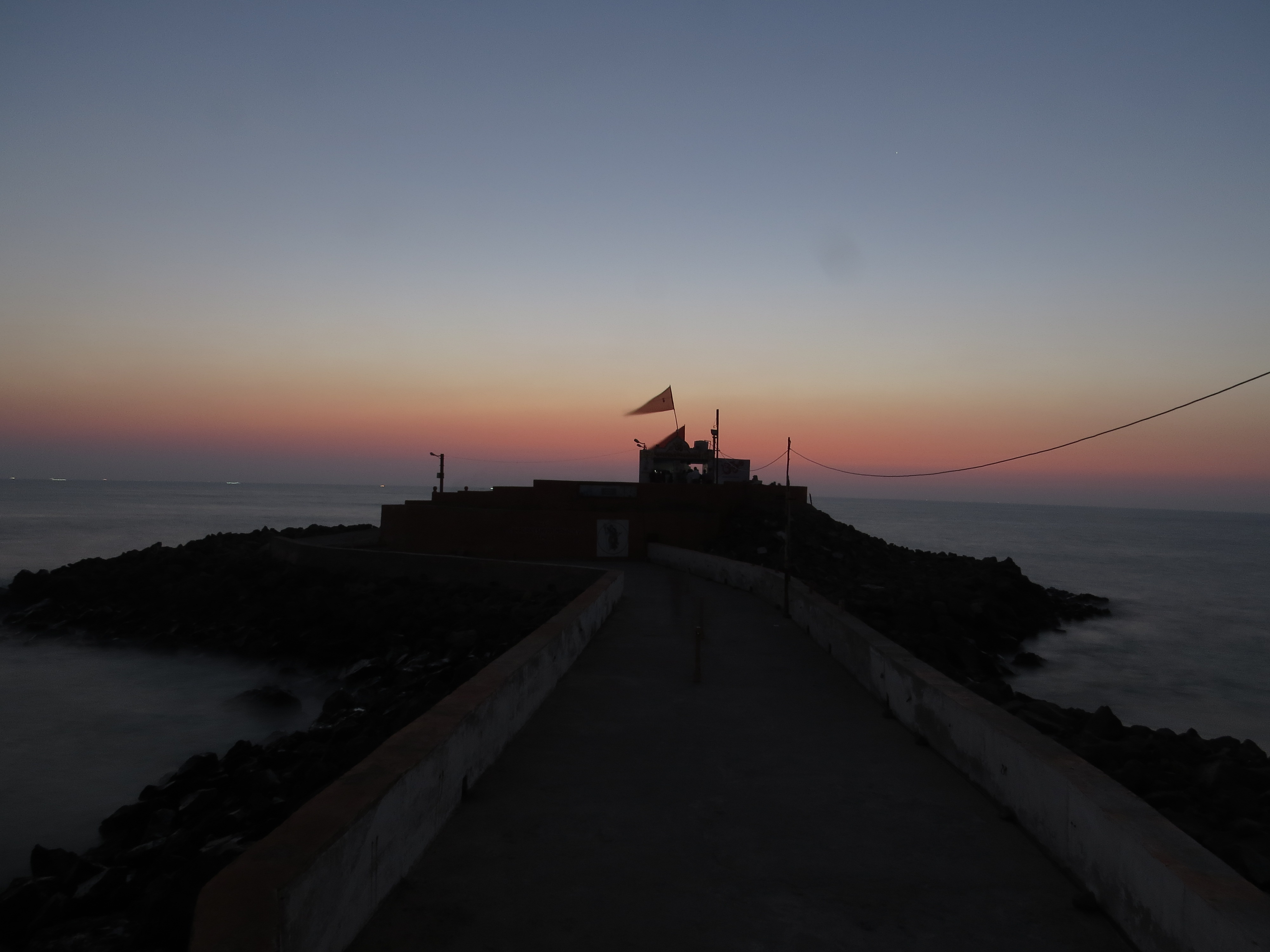
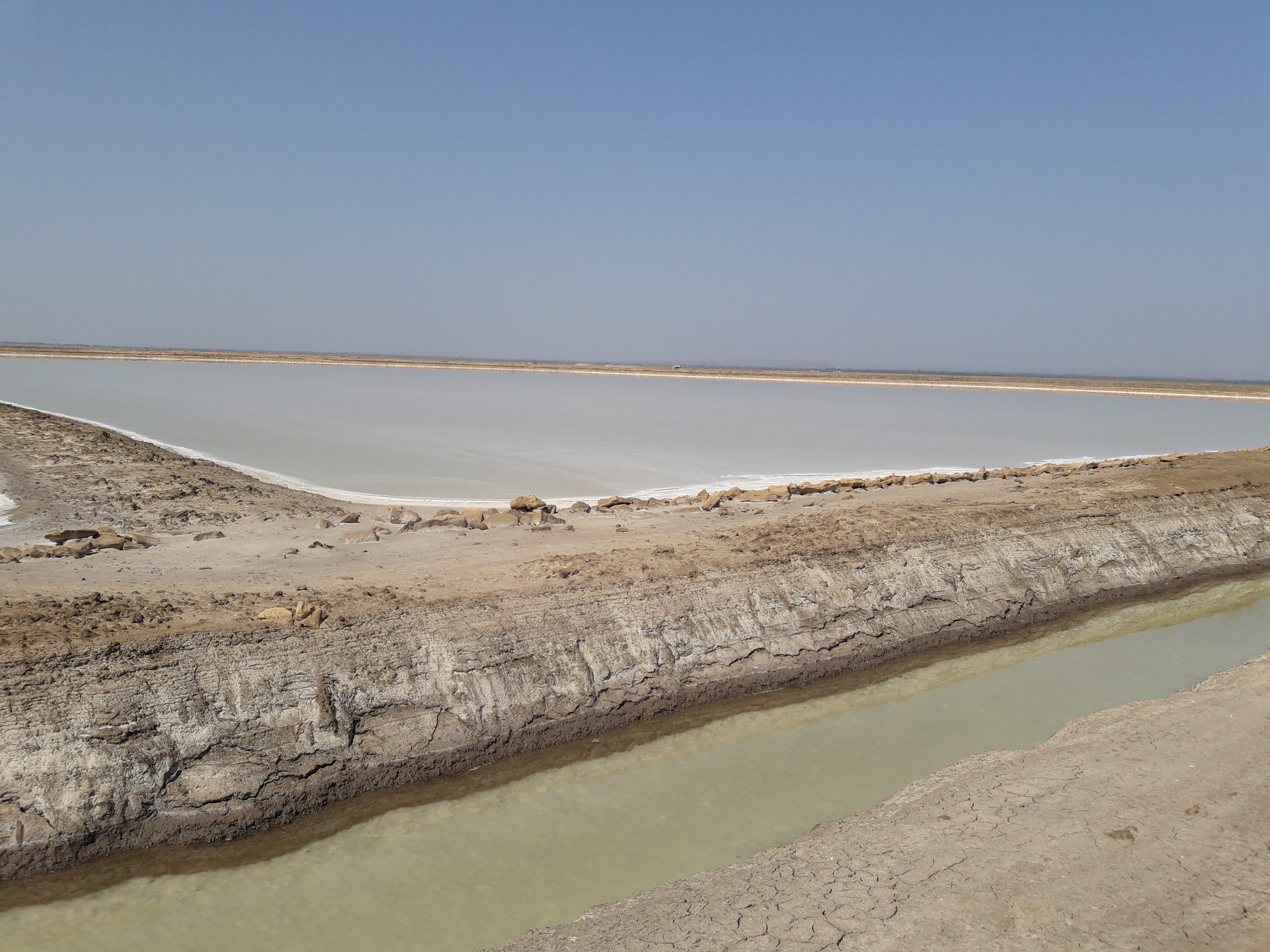
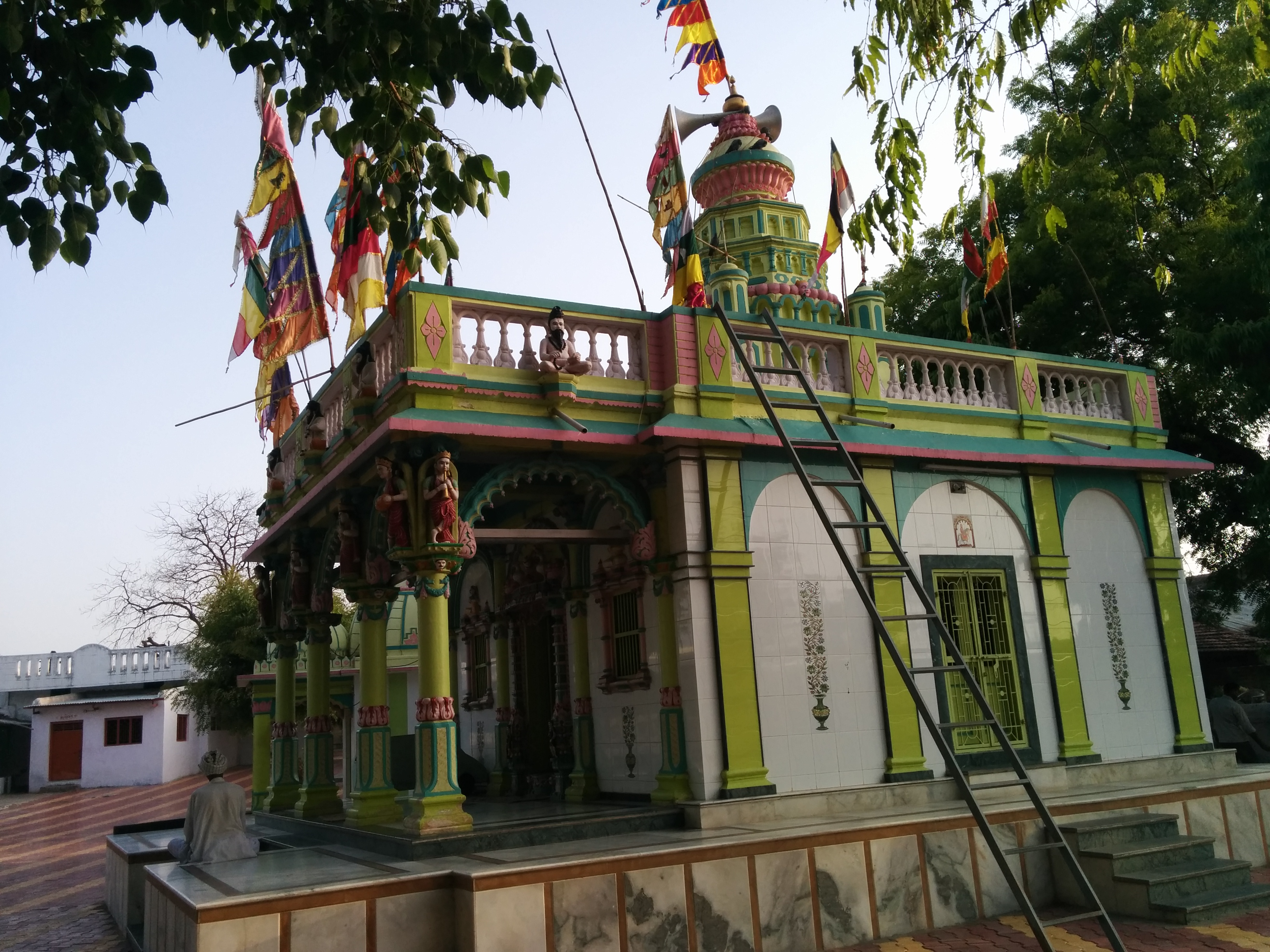
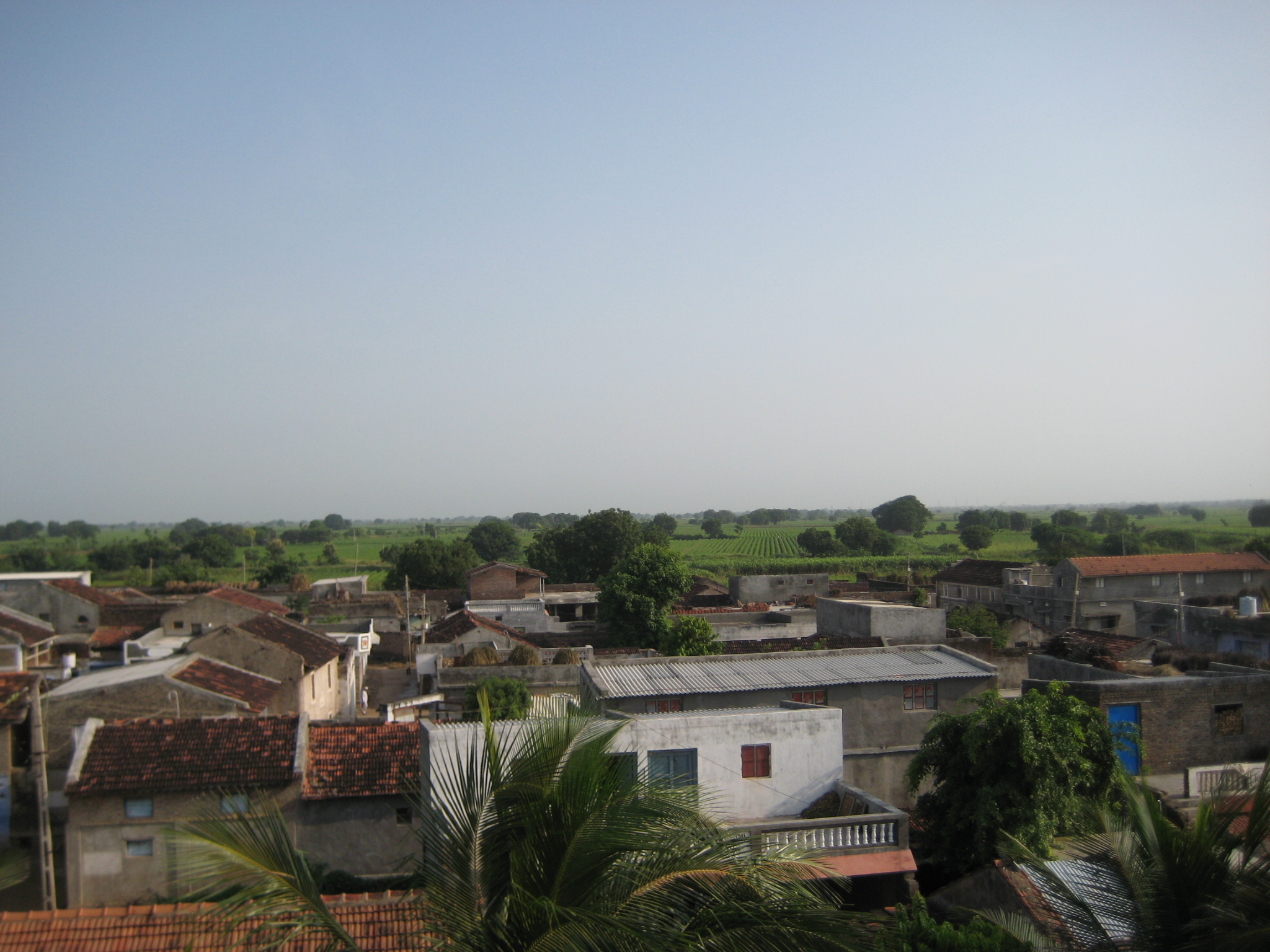
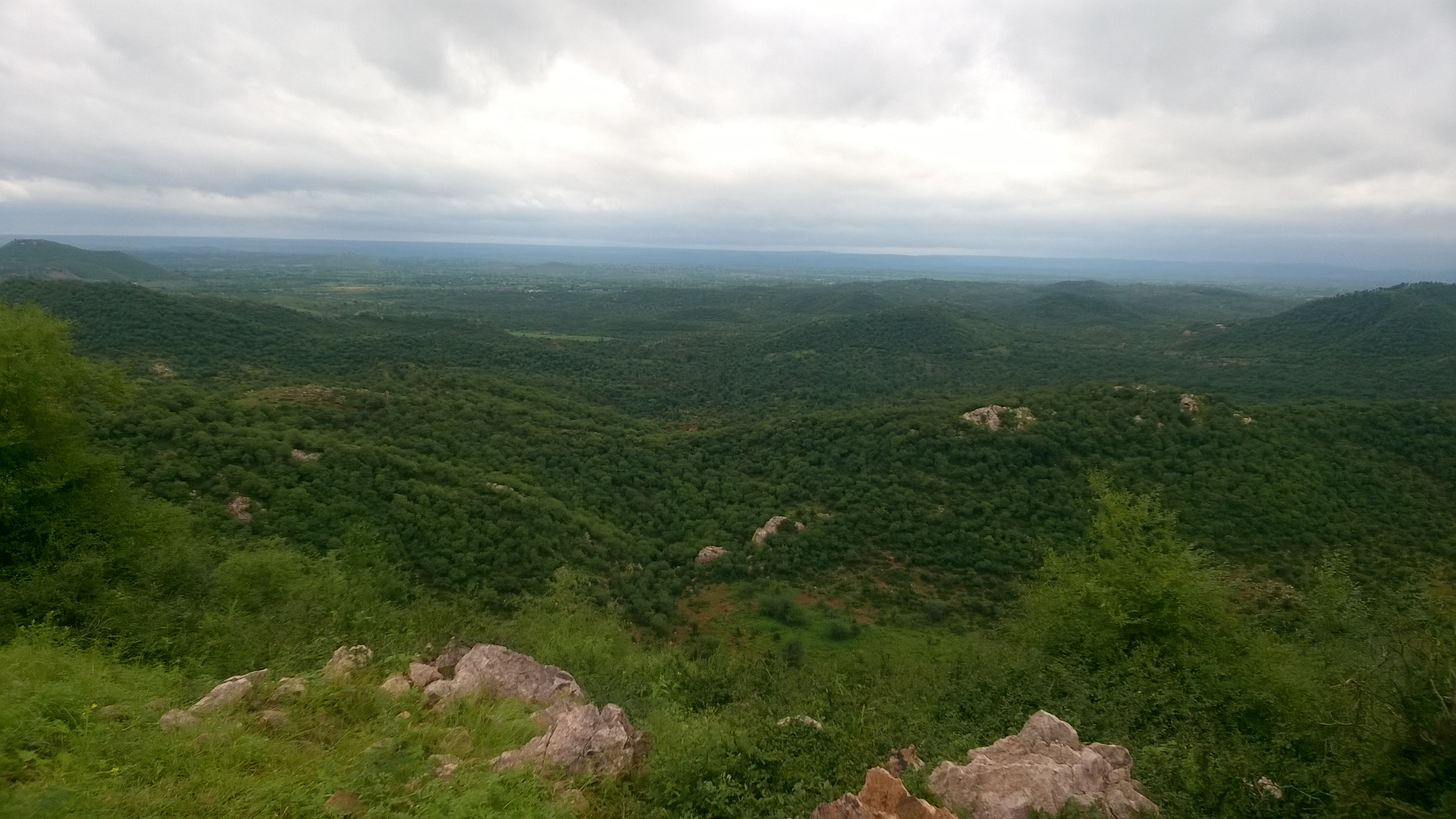
- Clockwise from top-left: Bhadkeshwar Mahadev Temple, Salt pan at Jafrabad, Dudhala village, Kotadi mountain, Ramdev Pir temple in Majadar

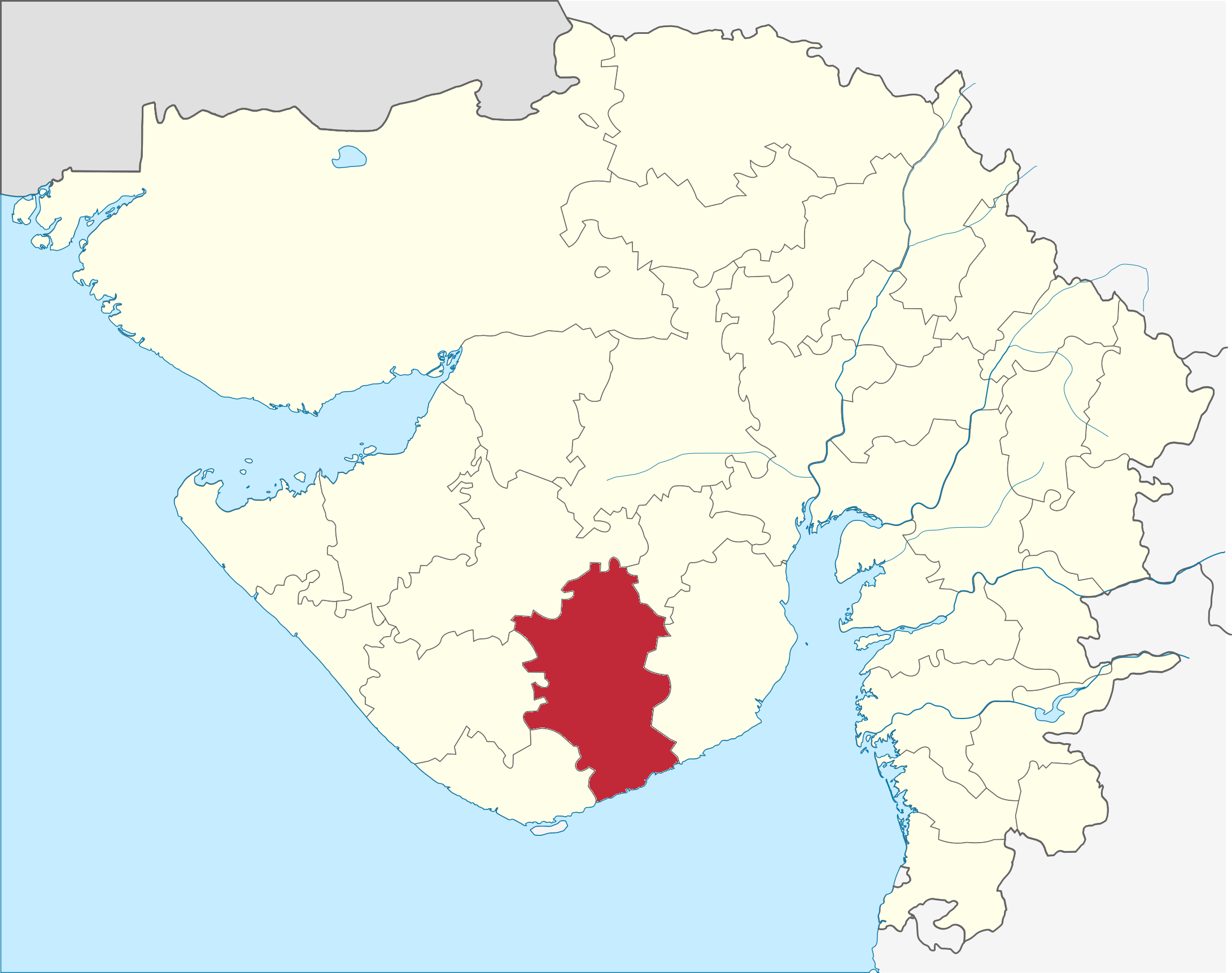
- location in Gujarat
- Interactive map of Amreli district
- Coordinates: 20°52′N 70°45′E
- Country: India
- State: Gujarat
- Region: Saurashtra
- Headquarters: Amreli

Government
  - District Collector: Gaurang Makwana, IAS
  - District Development Officer: Dinesh Gurav, IAS

Area
  - Total: 7,397 km^{2} (2,856 sq mi)

Population (2011)
  - Total: 1,514,190
  - Rank: 19 of 26 in Gujarat
  - Density: 204.7/km^{2} (530.2/sq mi)
  - Summer (DST): IST (UTC+05:30)
- Vehicle registration: GJ-14
- Website: gujaratindia.com

Amreli district is one of the 34 administrative districts of the state of Gujarat in western India. Amreli district headquarters are located at Amreli. The district occupies an area of 7,397 km^{2} and has a population of 1,514,190 of which 22.45% were urban (as of 2011).

== Etymology ==
Amreli district name derives its name from the town of Amreli, which is the headquarters of the district. It is believed that during the year 534 AD, Amreli existed as a city named Anumanji. After that it was renamed Amlik and then to Amravati. The ancient Sanskrit name of Amreli was Amarvalli.

== History ==
Initially, Amreli was a small village with an ancient history, and part of various kingdoms and empires established in the area. It shot into prominence, turning from village to town, when the Marathas began acquiring territory and establishing their reign over the region in 1780s. Besides levying taxes on the other rulers of the Kathiawar Peninsula, the Gaekwads also acquired their own territory and chose Amreli as the headquarters for their "Kathewad Pranth", which included Dwarka mandal. Vithalrao Devaji was appointed the Diwan (1801–1820), and during this period, Amreli grew and prospered. Vithalrao Devaji converted much of the adjoining forest land into farm land to realise revenue and also built the Nagnath Mahadev temple. Later in 1886, under the Gaikwad regime, compulsory and free education policy was adopted in Amreli for the first time. From the 18th century to 1959, Dwarika and Okhamandal was part of Gaikwad - Amreli state but after 1959, those two cities were merged with Jamnagar district.

During the British Raj, the Maratha Gaekwad dynasty organised its Baroda State into four administrative prants (equivalent to British Districts), namely Baroda itself, Kadi (the largest), Navsari and Amreli, the smallest.

After independence the district became the part of Bombay State and a separate district in Gujarat State after the bifurcation of Bombay State.

== Geography ==
Amreli has a variety of soils such as medium black, loamy, sandy, rocky inferior and saline.

== Politics ==
District	No.	Constituency	Name	Party	Remarks
Amreli	94	Dhari	Jaysukhbhai Kakadiya		
Amreli	95	Amreli	Kaushik Vekariya		
Amreli	96	Lathi	Janak Talaviya		
Amreli	97	Savarkundla	Mahesh Kaswala		
Amreli	98	Rajula	Hirabhai Solanki		

== Economy ==
Amreli district is industrially backward area. There are some small industries like oil mills spread over the district.

The economy depends upon agriculture. Agro-based industries are also well developed in the district. Mainly groundnut, cotton, sesame, bajri, wheat, and grams are grown therein. Fishery is an important sector in Rajula and Jafrabad talukas.

The district has 4 industrial estates under the GIDC (Gujarat Industrial Development Centres), two of which are in Babra. District has 4822 Small Scale Industries and 5 Medium Scale Industries in which Rs.4947.35 lakh is invested. 16,640 employments are generated through this industrial centres. Pipavav, Jafrabad and Victor ports are situated in the coastal district.

=== Gems ===
Gem cutting and polishing industries are located in Babra, while Savar Kundla taluka is famous for its manual weighing scales and electronic weighing machines across the country. Gold plating units exist in Bagasara city. The diamond trading industry is also well developed. There is a small gem cutting industry located in Dhari.

=== Mining ===
Rajula is famous for rajula stones which are famous worldwide.

=== Ginning ===
Babra is famous for Ginning industry with more than 50 ginning and pressing factories.

== Talukas ==
The district comprises 11 talukas.

- Amreli
- Babra
- Dhari
- Vadia
- Lathi
- Lilia
- Savar Kundla
- Khambha
- Rajula
- Jafrabad
- Bagasara
- Kunkavav Vadia Taluka

== Villages ==
- Keriyanagas
- Barvala-Baval
- Balel Pipariya
- Bhada
- Chital
- Chalala
- Dhari
- Savar Kundla
- Amrutvel, Savarkundla
- Shekh Pipariya
- Tori (Rampur)
- Rajula
- Rampar

== Rainfall ==
In 2021 and 2025, Saurashtra experienced heavy rainfall across various regions. In 2021, Amreli district saw intense downpours, with Bagasara receiving 74mm of rainfall and Lilia receiving 168 mm, leading to rescue operations in low-lying areas. On 23rd May and 17th June 2025, heavy rain again affected Amreli, with Kunkavav Vadia recording 189 mm and Bagasara also witnessing significant rainfall. Several nearby regions faced waterlogging and disruption due to the intense showers.

== Demographics ==
Historical population
Year	Pop.	±% p.a.
1901	339,702	—
1911	365,575	+0.74%
1921	363,009	−0.07%
1931	415,110	+1.35%
1941	501,270	+1.90%
1951	576,272	+1.40%
1961	716,720	+2.21%
1971	900,824	+2.31%
1981	1,138,394	+2.37%
1991	1,308,867	+1.41%
2001	1,393,918	+0.63%
2011	1,514,190	+0.83%

According to the 2011 census Amreli district has a population of 1,514,190, roughly equal to the nation of Gabon or the US state of Hawaii. This gives it a ranking of 329th in India (out of a total of 640). The district has a population density of 205 inhabitants per square kilometre (530/sq mi). Its population growth rate over the decade 2001-2011 was 8.59%. Amreli has a sex ratio of 964 females for every 1000 males, and a literacy rate of 74.49%. 386,635 (25.53%) lived in urban areas. Scheduled Castes and Scheduled Tribes make up 8.78% and 0.48% of the population respectively.

Religions in Amreli district (2011)
Religion	Percent
Hinduism	93.00%
Islam	6.15%
Other or not stated	0.91%

Hindus are 93.15% while Muslims are 6.55% of the population.

=== Language ===
Languages of Amreli district (2011)
1. Gujarati (99.0%)
2. Hindi (0.66%)
3. Others (0.36%)

At the time of the 2011 census, 99.00% of the population spoke Gujarati and 0.66% Hindi as their first language.

=== Cities and towns ===
The population development of the cities and towns in Amreli.

Name (Note: Source: Office of the Registrar General and Census Commissioner (web), Delimitation Commission of India (web), Rand McNally International Atlas 1994, School of Planning & Architecture (web).)	Status	Population Census 1991-03-01	Population Census 2001-03-01	Population Census 2011-03-01
Amreli	Municipality with Outgrowth	67,827	95,307	117,967
Babra	Municipality	...	19,071	25,270
Bagasara	Municipality	28,389	31,796	34,521
Chalala	Municipality	16,193	16,915	16,721
Damnagar	Municipality	13,946	16,719	16,614
Jafrabad	Municipality	17,553	25,086	27,167
Lathi	Municipality	16,558	20,966	21,173
Lilia	Census Town	...	9,902	10,359
Rajula	Municipality	26,571	32,395	38,489
Savarkundla	Municipality	64,815	73,774	78,354

== Notable people ==
- Bhoja Bhagat - poet-saint
- Hanu Dhorajiya - politician.
- Yogiji Maharaj - Hindu sadhu and guru
- Jivraj Narayan Mehta - first Chief Minister of Gujarat
- Ramesh Parekh, famous poet of Gujarat.
- Kalapi - writer & poet and was also Thakor of Lathi.
- Kavi Kant - poet
- Manubhai Kotadia - politician.
- Muktanand Swami - sadhu and paramahansa of Swaminarayan sampraday.
- Savji Dholakia - diamond merchant from Surat and the founder of Hari Krishna Exports Pvt. Ltd.
- Vasant Gajera - Entrepreneur Investor Philanthropist
- Dharmajivandasji Swami - founder of Gurukul Sanstha
- Pan Nalin - International Film Director (Hollywood & Bollywood)

== See also ==
- Amreli Steels
