= Dudhala =

- Village
- Location in Gujarat, India Dudhala (India)
- Coordinates: 21.68°N 71.36°E
- Country: India
- State: Gujarat
- District: Amreli district

Languages
  - Official: Gujarati
- Time zone: UTC+5:30 (IST)
  - Summer (DST): Indian Standard Time
- PIN: 365660
- Vehicle registration: GJ
- Website: gujaratindia.com

Dudhala is a small village situated in the Lathi taluka of Amreli district in Gujarat, India. It holds the distinction of being the first village in Gujarat to be completely solarised through a foundation-led initiative.

== About ==
Located approx. 5 km from Lathi (also Kavi Kalapi's Lathi) and 25 km from Amreli city. Population of the village is around 1880 people.

== Solar Village of Gujarat ==
In March 2022, Shree Ramkrishna Knowledge Foundation (SRKKF), was established by the prominent diamantaire of India, Govind Dholakia. Notably, SRKKF has initiated the solarization project in Dudhala, located in Southern Gujarat. This project involves the installation of a 450 KW solar rooftop system, aimed at providing sustainable energy to approximately 350 households and public facilities such as Anganwadi and the Gram Panchayat.

Dudhala becomes the 1st village to be entirely powered by solar panels through a foundation-led initiative. The project emphasizes community empowerment, enabling nearly 2000 residents to generate income from the solar rooftop systems.

== Jal Utsav ==
In November 2023, Dudhala hosted Gujarat's first Jal Utsav (Water Festival), inaugurated by the Chief Minister of Gujarat, Bhupendra Patel, and attended by the Governor, Acharya Devvrat. Organized by the state government in collaboration with the Dholakia Foundation, this ten-day event, known as Jal Utsav 2023, aimed to address the water crisis in the Saurashtra region and promote water conservation. The festival included cultural performances, educational workshops, and exhibitions, emphasizing the village's commitment to sustainable environmental practices.

== Notable people ==
- Govind Dholakia of Shree Ramkrishna Exports (SRK).
- Savji Dholakia of Hari Krishna Exports.
