= Shedubhar =

Shedubhar શેડુભાર
- Shedubhar
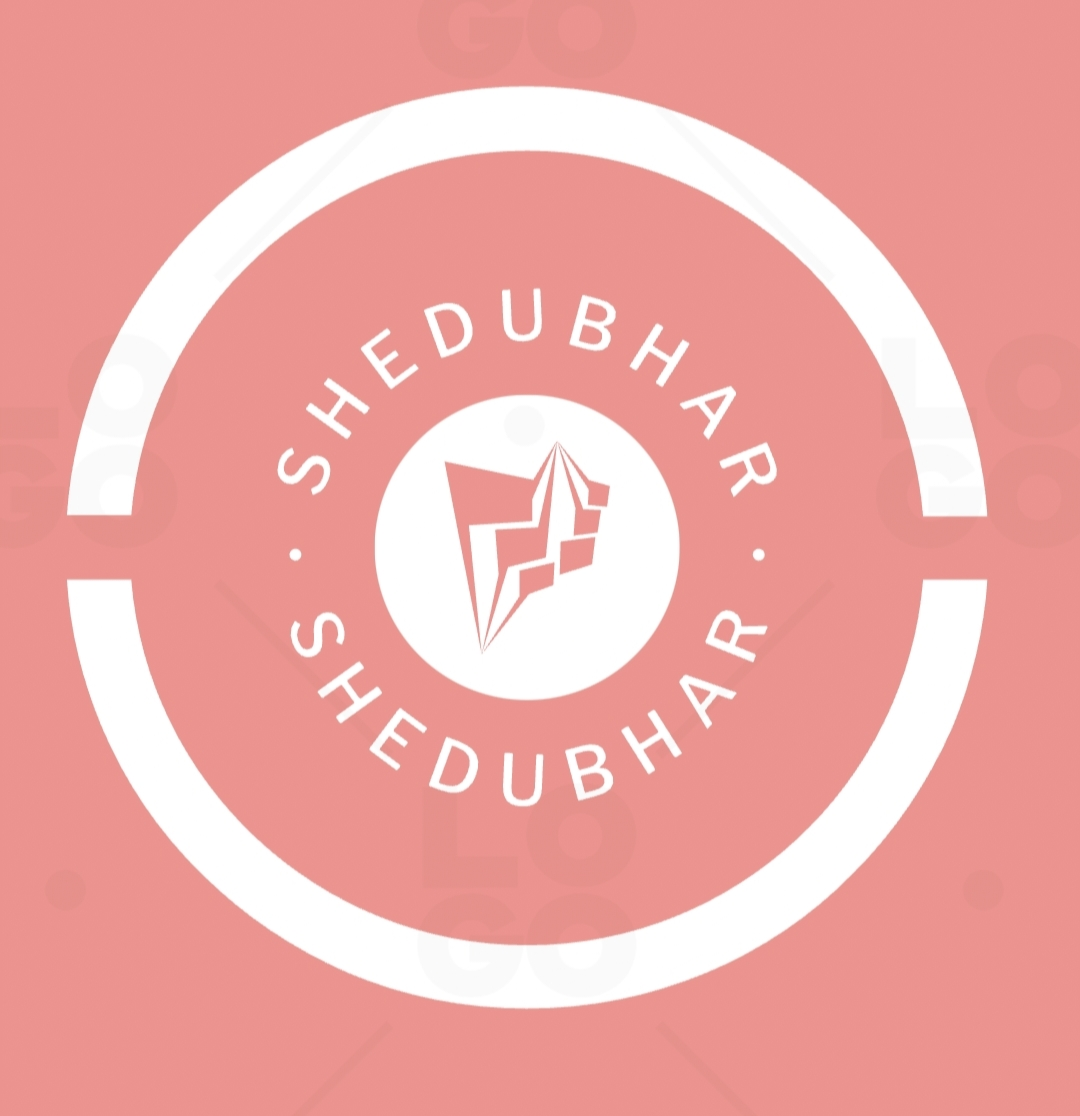
- Anthem: Jan Gan Man
- Political Party: Bhartiya Janta Party

Government

Population
  - Total: 9,500
- Postal code: 365430
- Area code: 365430
- District: Amreli
- Taluka: Amreli
- Country: India
- Website: http://shedubhar.rf.gd

Shedubhar is a village in Amreli Taluka in Amreli District in the Saurashtra region of the western Indian state of Gujarat. The main occupation of the people of Shedubhar is agriculture.

== Schools ==
- Shree Swami Vivekananda Vidhyalaya Shedubhar
- Samrth Vidhyalay Shedubhar
- Janta Vidhyalaya Shedubhar
- Shedubhar High
- Shedubhar Secondary School

== Politicians ==
• Suresh Kumbhani (Sarpanch)

- Ramesh Kotadiya (President)
- Ghanshyam Polara (Vice President)
- J.B. Gajera (Ex-Sarpanch)

== College ==
- College of Dairy Science
- Post Graduate Institute of Dairy Education and Research.

== Religious places ==
- Kamnath Mahadev Temple
- Tatkalik Hanuman Temple
- Shitla Mata Nu Temple
- Radhakrishnan Temple
- Sarmaliyadada Temple
- Shree Swaminarayan Temple
- Ramji Temple
- Shankar Temple
- Khodiyar Temple
- Shree Gel Ambe Dham
- Bapasitaram Madhuli
- Bhutada Aapa Mandir
