= Diamonds Are Forever =

Diamonds Are Forever may refer to:

== James Bond ==
- Diamonds Are Forever (novel), a 1956 James Bond novel by Ian Fleming
  - Diamonds Are Forever (film), a 1971 film adapted from the novel
    - Diamonds Are Forever (soundtrack), a soundtrack album
      - "Diamonds Are Forever" (song), the title song

== Literature ==
- Diamonds Are Forever, a novel-length story by Eric Flint and Ryk E. Spoor, featured in the 2004 anthology Mountain Magic
- Diamonds Are Forever, a 2012 novel by Ashley & JaQuavis

== Music ==
- The Remix Album...Diamonds Are Forever, a 2000 remix album by Shirley Bassey
- Diamonds Are Forever, a 1999 album by Funky Diamonds
- Diamonds Are Forever, a 2006 album by Legs Diamond
- Diamonds Are Forever, a 2011 mixtape by Trina
- "Diamonds Are Forever", a song by Franck Pourcel from Strictly Breaks Volume 11
- "Diamonds Are Forever", a song from the musical Diamonds
- "Diamonds Are Forever", a song by Sabrina Carpenter from Singular: Act I
- "diamonds are forever", a 2026 song by bbno$

== Television ==
- "Diamonds Are Forever", American Chronicles episode 12 (1990)
- "Diamonds Are Forever", Animal Kingdom season 6, episode 6 (2022)
- "Diamonds Are Forever", Blinky Bill season 3, episode 9 (2004)
- "Diamonds Are Forever", First Wives Club season 1, episode 3 (2019)
- "Diamonds Are Forever", Forever (2014) episode 13 (2015)
- "Diamonds Are Forever", Hardcore Pawn: Chicago episode 13 (2013)
- "Diamonds Are Forever", Keeping Up with the Kardashians season 14, episode 15 (2018)
- "Diamonds Are Forever", One Day at a Time (1975) season 7, episode 17 (1982)
- "Diamonds Are Forever", Zoo Family episode 7 (1985)

== See also ==
- A Diamond is Forever, an advertising slogan of De Beers
- "Diamonds from Sierra Leone", a 2005 song by Kanye West, which samples the Shirley Bassey recording of "Diamonds Are Forever"
- "Diamonds Aren't Forever", a song by Bring Me the Horizon from Suicide Season
- Diamonds Are Forever, So Are Morals, a 2022 book about the Indian entrepreneur Govind Dholakia
