= Govind Dholakia =

Indian businessman and politician (born 1949)

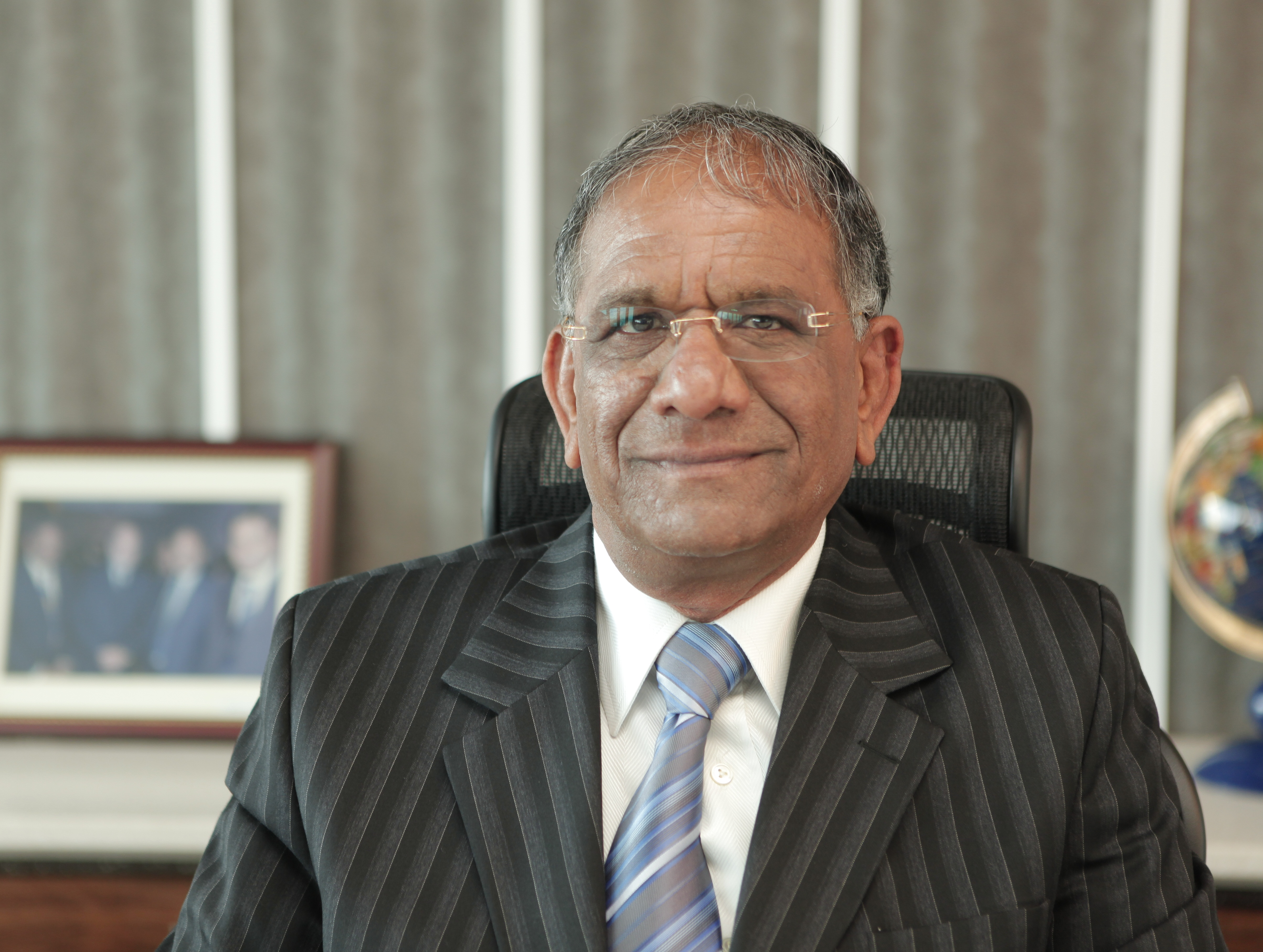
- Dholakia in 2011

Member of Parliament, Rajya Sabha from Gujarat
- Incumbent
- Assumed office 3 April 2024
- Preceded by: Mansukh Mandaviya

Personal details
- Born: 7 November 1949 (age 76) Dudhala, Gujarat, India
- Party: Bharatiya Janata Party
- Spouse: Champaben Dholakia
- Children: 3
- Parent(s): Laljibhai Dholakia, Santokbaa Dholakia
- Occupation: Businessman, politician
- Known for: Diamonds Are Forever, So Are Morals by Penguin Random House
- Nickname: "Kaka"

Govindbhai Laljibhai Dholakia (born 7 November 1949) is an Indian businessman and politician. He has been serving as a Member of Rajya Sabha from Gujarat since April 2024, representing the Bharatiya Janata Party.

== Early life ==
Dholakia was born in Leuva Patidar Family in Dudhala, Lathi taluka, Amreli district, Gujarat, into a farming family. He later moved to Surat in 1964 to support his family.

== Career ==
Dholakia is the founder of Shree Ramkrishna Exports Private Limited, a diamond export enterprise based in Surat. In 2024, he was elected as the Rajya Sabha member representing Gujarat.

== Philanthropy ==
In 2021, he donated ₹11 crore (US$1.2 million) to the construction of the Ayodhya Ram Mandir.

In 2022, Dholakia oversaw the transition of his hometown, Dudhala, to solar energy through the corporate social responsibility (CSR) initiatives of his company.

== Awards ==
In 2017, Govind received the Leadership Award from the U.S. Green Building Council (USGBC).

== In media ==
=== Books ===
- Tiwari, Arun; Yagnik, Kamlesh (2022). Diamonds Are Forever, So Are Morals. Penguin Random House. ISBN 9789391149895.

=== Shows ===
- Brands of Tomorrow, Season 2 on JioHotstar.
