= Arjansukh =

Village in Gujarat state, India

Coordinates: 21.650°N 70.895°E

Arjansukh is a village in Kunkavav Taluka of Amreli district, Gujarat, India. It is about twenty-nine miles east of Junagadh and twenty-one miles west of Amreli.

== History ==
During the British period, the village was a separate taluka; in 1806–1807, it fell under the jurisdiction of Junagadh State. The village had a share of the representative of the firm of Gopalrao Mairal of Baroda State.

== Connectivity ==
The Khakhria railway station on the Bhavnagar-Dhoraji line is only two miles to the north of this village.
