= Nana Machiyala =

Village in Gujarat, India

- city
- Location in Gujarat, India Nana Machiyala (India)
- Coordinates: 21.62°N 71.23°E
- Country: India
- State: Gujarat
- District: Amreli

Government
  - Type: Ahir
  - Editor: Kothival
- Elevation: 128 m (420 ft)

Population (2011)
  - Total: 190,243

Languages
  - Official: Gujarati, Hindi, English
- Time zone: UTC+5:30 (IST)
- PIN: 365601
- Telephone code: 02792
- Vehicle registration: GJ 14
- Website: collectoramreli.gujarat.gov.in

Nana Machiyala is a small village located about 7 kilometers away from the city of Amreli in the state of Gujarat in India. The village is at least 300 years old and has been the home of many farmers and farmhands. Recent demographic and economic changes have resulted in the exodus of many young people from NaNa Machiyala to urban areas of Gujarat. The village has recently built a Sant Shree Bholi Aai Temple, Swaminarayan, Machu Maa and Bhimnath Mahadev mandir.
