= Amreli taluka =

Sub-district in Amreli, Gujarat, India

Amreli
- Taluka
- Interactive map of Amreli
- Coordinates: 21°37′00″N 71°14′00″E
- Country: India
- State: Gujarat
- District: Amreli
- Headquarters: Amreli

Government
  - Body: Amreli Municipality

Population (2011)
  - Total: 241,279
  - Gender ratio: 963
  - Literacy: 75.8%

Languages
  - Official: Gujarati, Hindi
- Time zone: UTC+5:30 (IST)
- Telephone code: +91-079
- Vehicle registration: GJ
- Civic agency: Amreli Municipality
- Website: www.amreli.nic.in

Amreli Taluka is a local administrative division situated in the Amreli district of the Indian state of Gujarat.

== Geography ==
Map of Amreli district

Geographically, Amreli Taluka is located in the southwestern part of Gujarat. The region's climatic conditions are influenced by the summer monsoon season (June to September), during which the vast majority of the region's rainfall occurs.

=== Climate ===
Climate data for Amreli (1981–2010, extremes 1973–2012)
Month	Jan	Feb	Mar	Apr	May	Jun	Jul	Aug	Sep	Oct	Nov	Dec	Year
Record high °C (°F)	36.6 (97.9)	39.0 (102.2)	43.6 (110.5)	45.6 (114.1)	46.2 (115.2)	45.6 (114.1)	39.1 (102.4)	38.6 (101.5)	40.1 (104.2)	42.1 (107.8)	38.2 (100.8)	36.6 (97.9)	46.2 (115.2)
Mean daily maximum °C (°F)	29.6 (85.3)	32.1 (89.8)	36.5 (97.7)	40.1 (104.2)	40.6 (105.1)	37.2 (99.0)	32.6 (90.7)	31.1 (88.0)	33.0 (91.4)	35.2 (95.4)	33.1 (91.6)	30.7 (87.3)	34.3 (93.7)
Mean daily minimum °C (°F)	11.5 (52.7)	14.0 (57.2)	18.7 (65.7)	22.6 (72.7)	25.2 (77.4)	26.3 (79.3)	25.1 (77.2)	24.2 (75.6)	23.2 (73.8)	21.0 (69.8)	16.5 (61.7)	12.7 (54.9)	20.1 (68.2)
Record low °C (°F)	1.6 (34.9)	3.5 (38.3)	9.1 (48.4)	14.1 (57.4)	18.0 (64.4)	20.6 (69.1)	21.4 (70.5)	21.1 (70.0)	18.1 (64.6)	14.4 (57.9)	9.1 (48.4)	4.1 (39.4)	1.6 (34.9)
Average rainfall mm (inches)	0.0 (0.0)	0.0 (0.0)	0.0 (0.0)	1.5 (0.06)	7.2 (0.28)	98.0 (3.86)	205.3 (8.08)	128.5 (5.06)	97.4 (3.83)	17.5 (0.69)	6.2 (0.24)	0.0 (0.0)	561.8 (22.12)
Average rainy days	0.0	0.0	0.0	0.1	0.7	4.2	8.9	7.0	4.3	1.0	0.4	0.0	26.6
Average relative humidity (%) (at 17:30 IST)	27	21	20	19	27	52	68	72	62	39	32	29	39
Source: India Meteorological Department

== Administrative divisions ==
Amreli Taluka is subdivided into multiple villages and towns. As of the most recent national census in 2011, there were 71 villages in the taluka.

== Economy ==
Amreli Taluka's economy is concentrated in agriculture, with a focus on crops such as groundnuts, cotton, and cereals. The area's naturally occurring precipitation during the monsoon season, coupled with modern irrigation facilities, has enabled farmers to conduct both rainfed and irrigation agriculture. The taluka's economy also includes trade and several small-scale industries, such as the manufacturing of traditional cotton cloth (khadi), silverworks, tanning and cotton ginning.
