= Jalia (Amreli) =

Jalia Jaliya
- village
- Location in Gujarat, India Jalia (India)
- Coordinates: 21°59′N 71°21′E
- Country: India
- State: Gujarat
- District: Amreli

Government
  - Type: Panchayat raj
  - Body: Gram panchayat

Area
  - Total: 50 km^{2} (19 sq mi)

Population (2014)
  - Total: 5,500
  - Density: 110/km^{2} (280/sq mi)

Languages
  - Official: Gujarati, Hindi
- Time zone: UTC+5:30 (IST)
- Postal code: 365616
- Vehicle registration: GJ
- Nearest city: Amreli
- Website: gujaratindia.com

Jalia is a small village in the Amreli District of Gujarat, India. It is located 22 kilometers (14 mi) from Amreli.
