= Bandra Kurla Complex =

Business district in Mumbai, India

The Bandra Kurla Complex (BKC) वांद्रे कुर्ला संकुल
- Commercial area
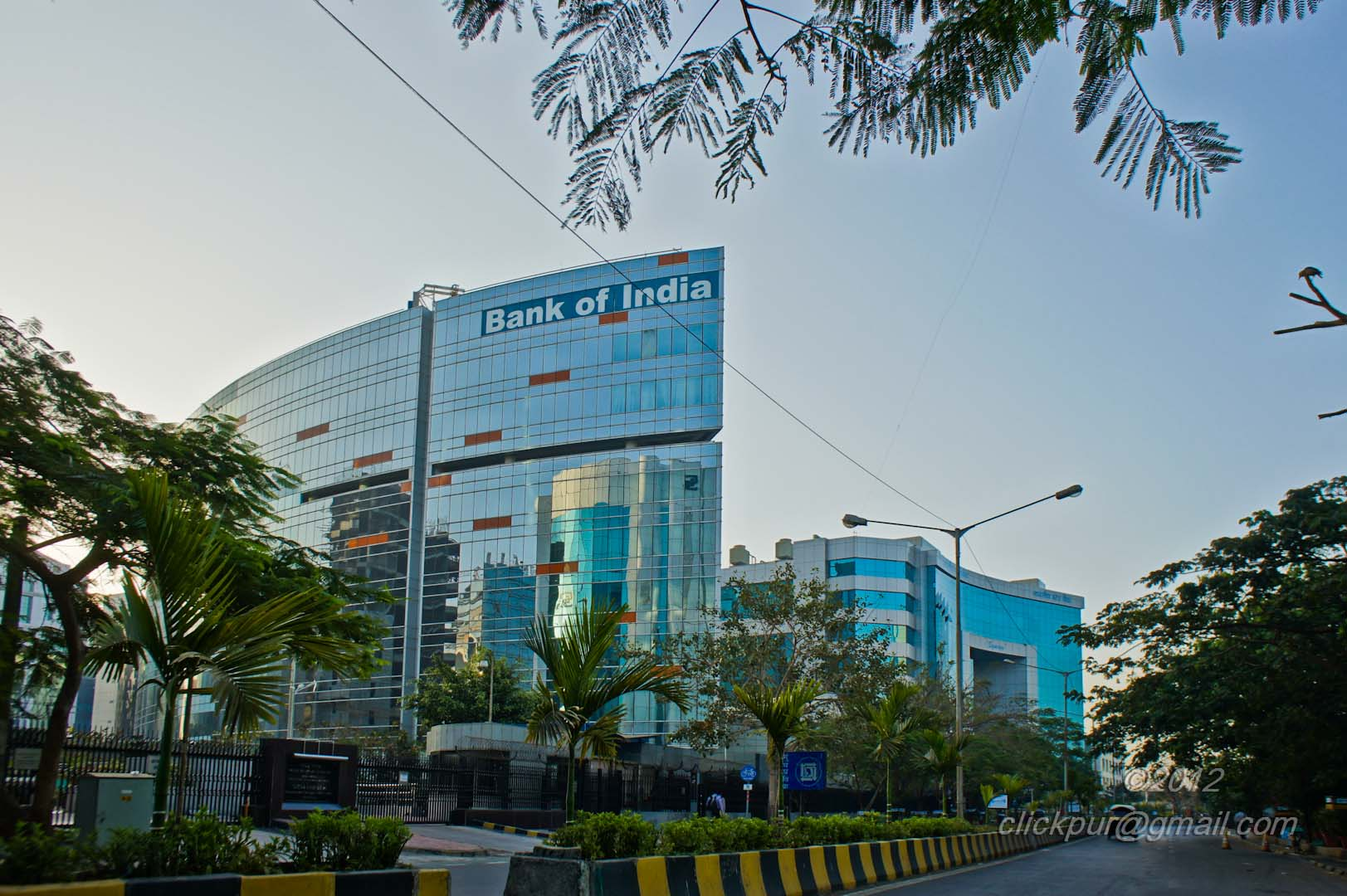
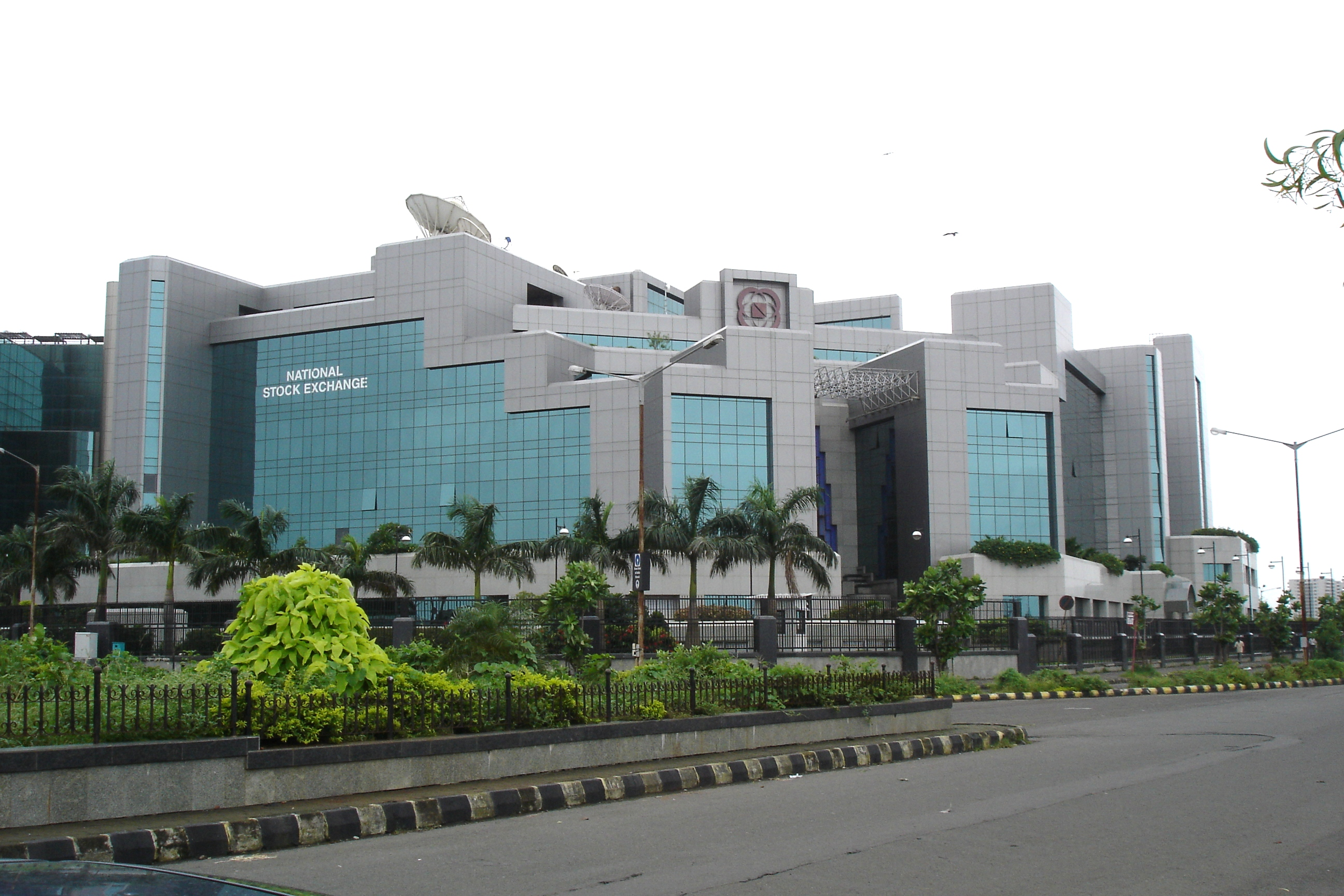
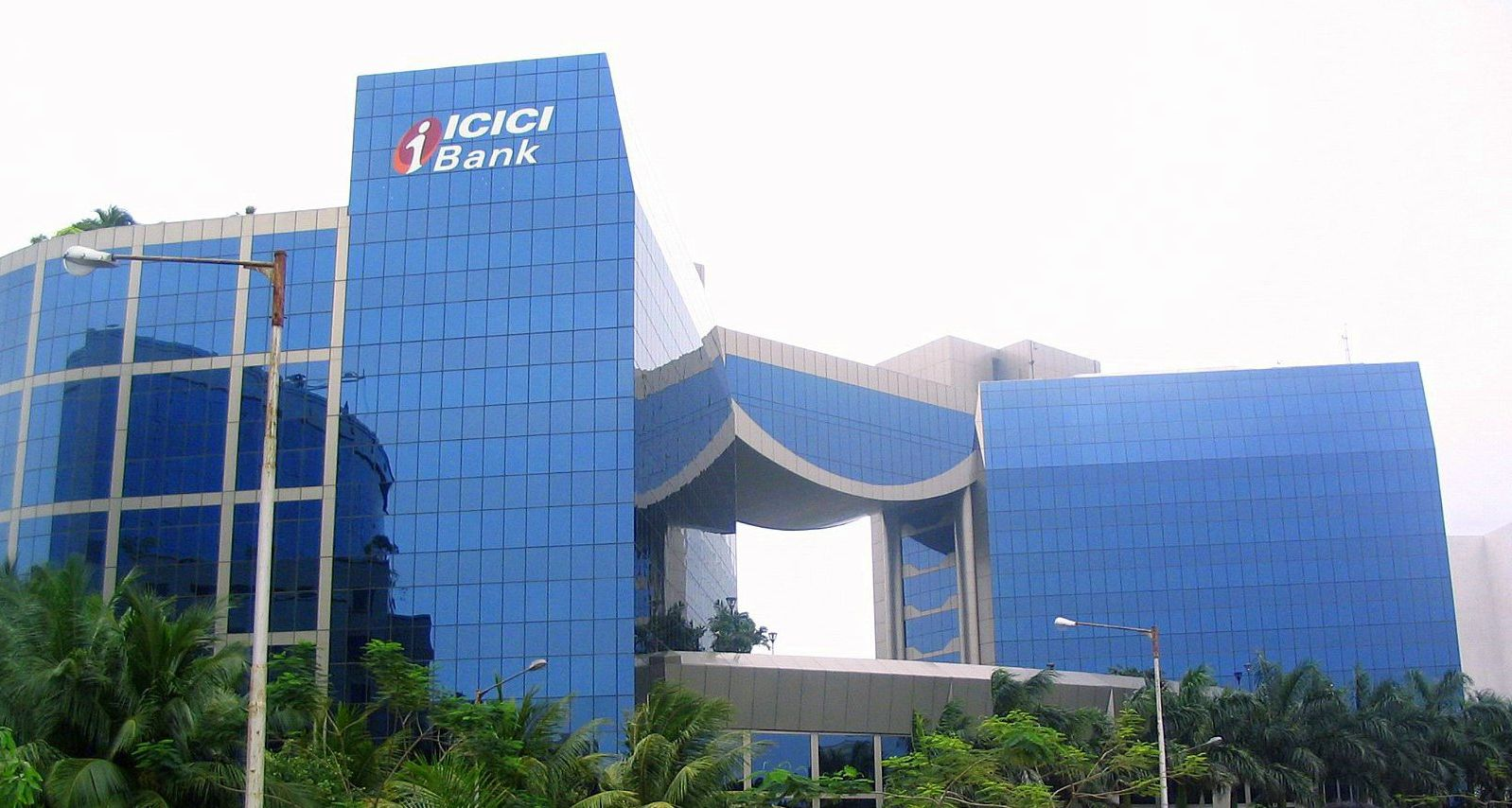
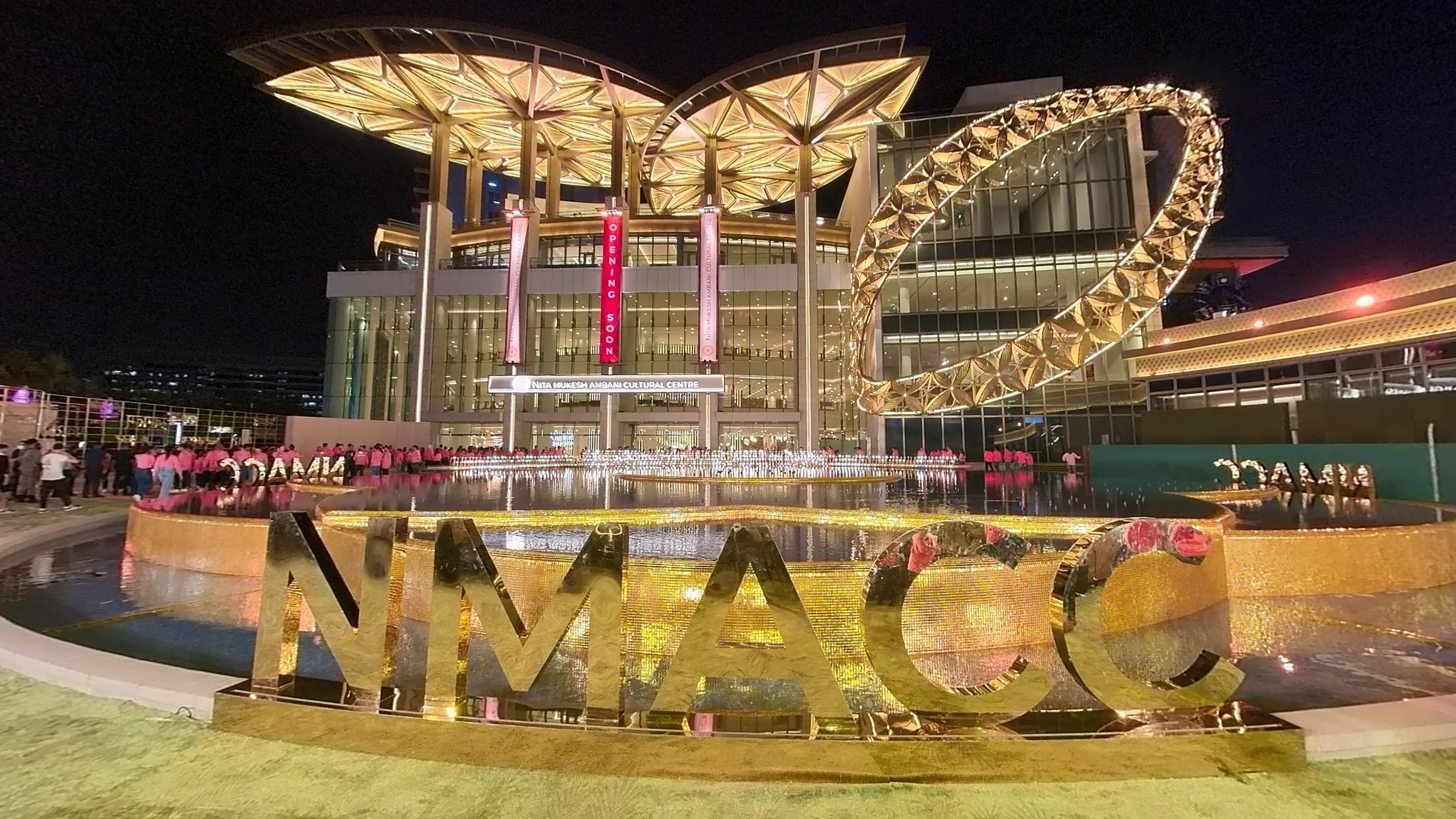
- (From top) Bank of India headquarters, NSE building, ICICI Bank headquarters, Nita Mukesh Ambani Cultural Centre
- Interactive map of The Bandra Kurla Complex (BKC)
- Country: India
- State: Maharashtra
- District: Mumbai Suburban
- City: Mumbai

Government
  - Type: Municipal Corporation
  - Body: Brihanmumbai Municipal Corporation (MCGM)

Languages
  - Official: Marathi
- Time zone: UTC+5:30 (IST)
- PIN: 400051
- Area code: 022
- Vehicle registration: MH 01 (South Mumbai end); MH 02 (Bandra end); MH 03 (Kurla end)
- Civic agency: MMRDA

Wockhardt headquarters

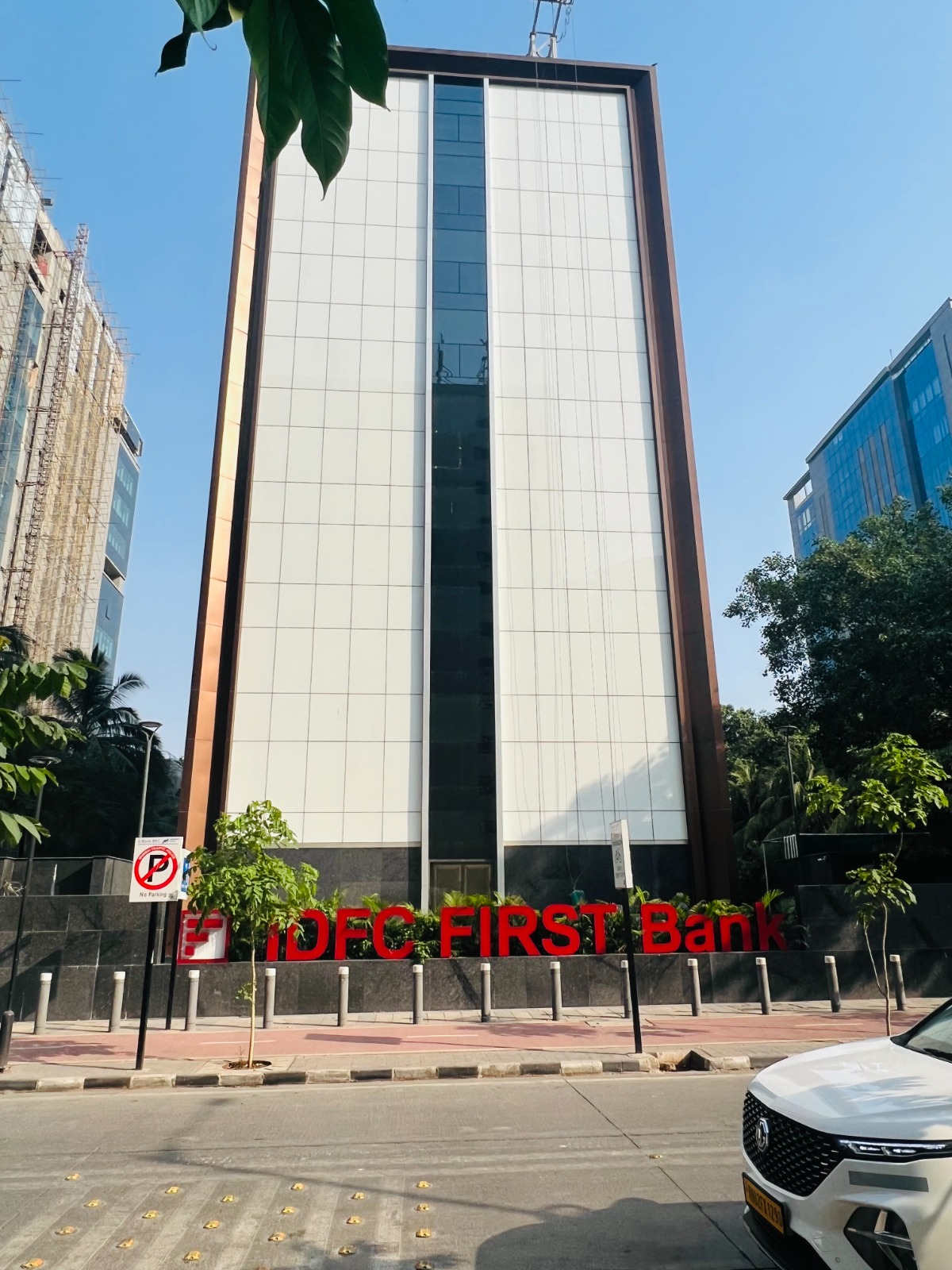
IDFC First Bank headquarters

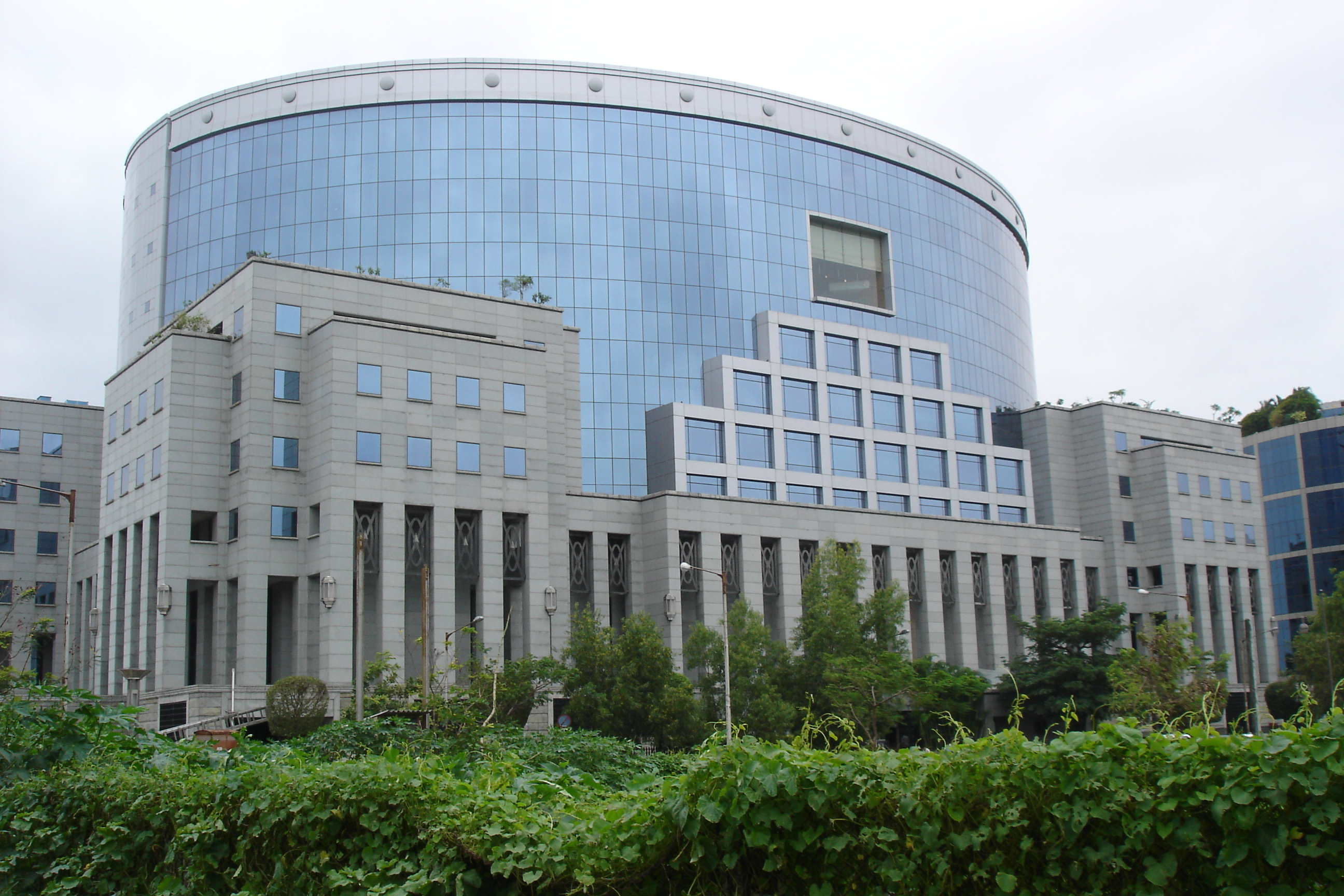
IL&FS headquarters

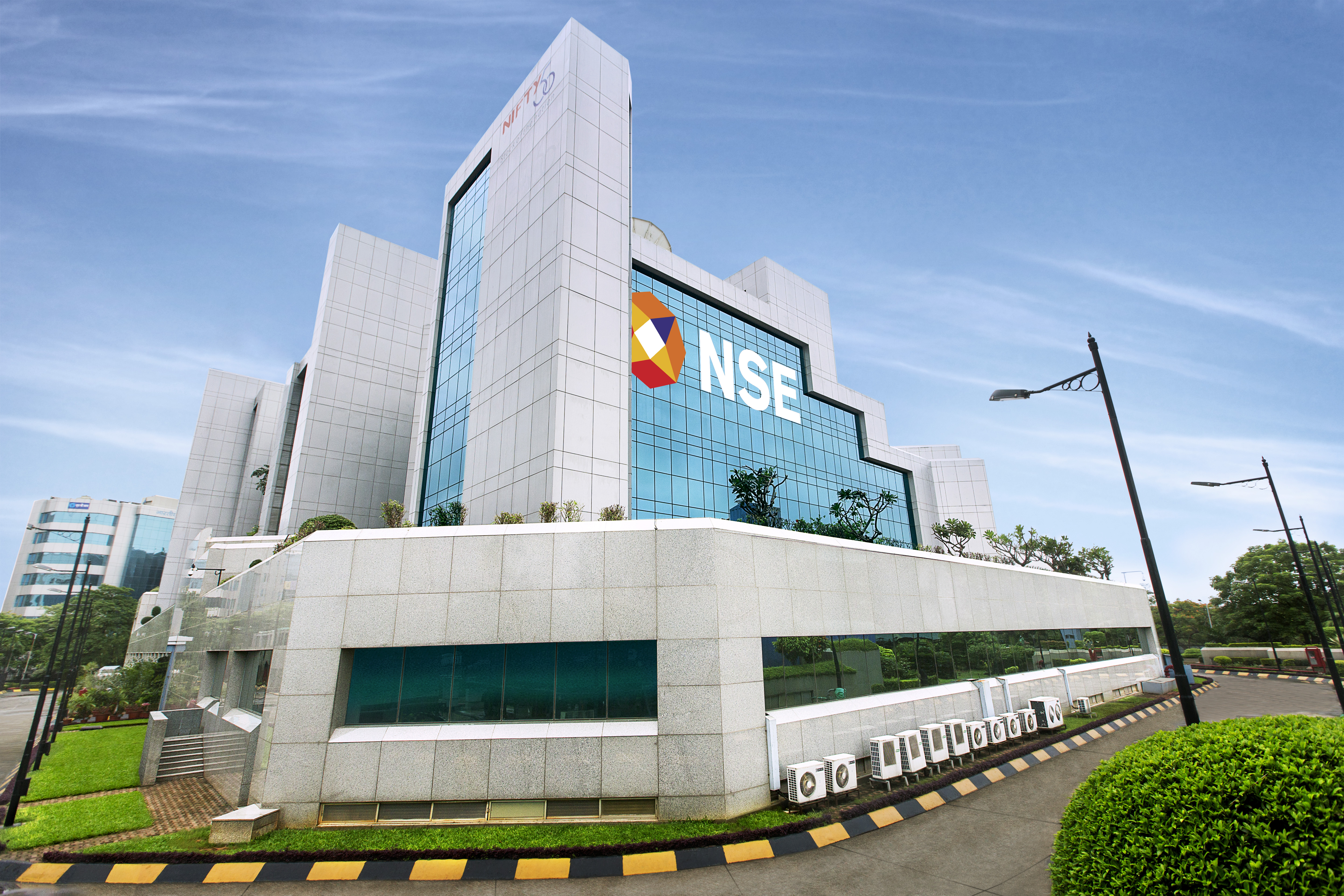
NSE building at Bandra Kurla Complex

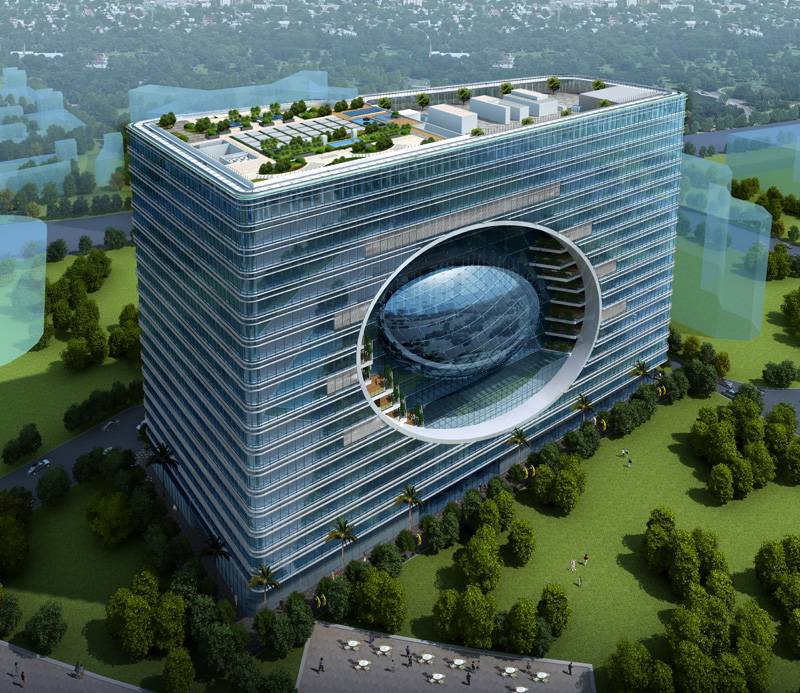
The Capital

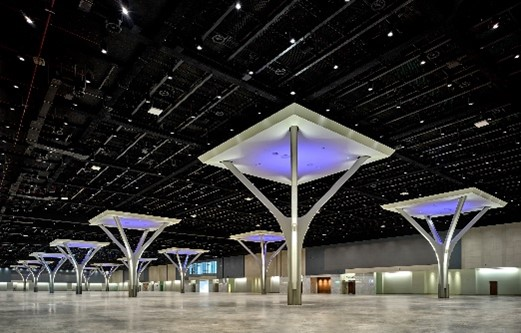
Jio World Centre

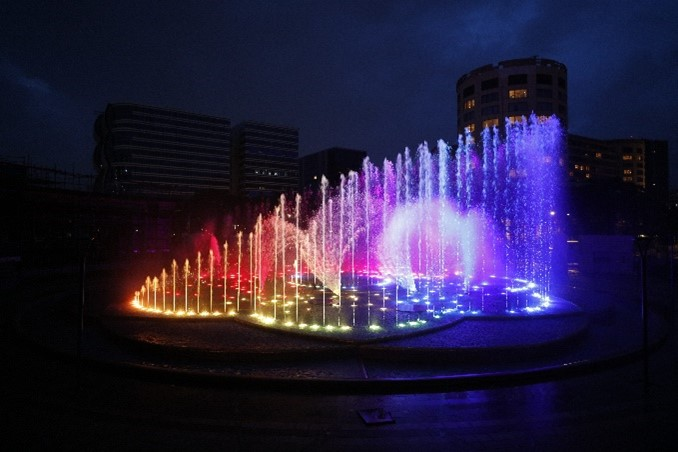
Fountain of Joy, Dhirubhai Ambani Square

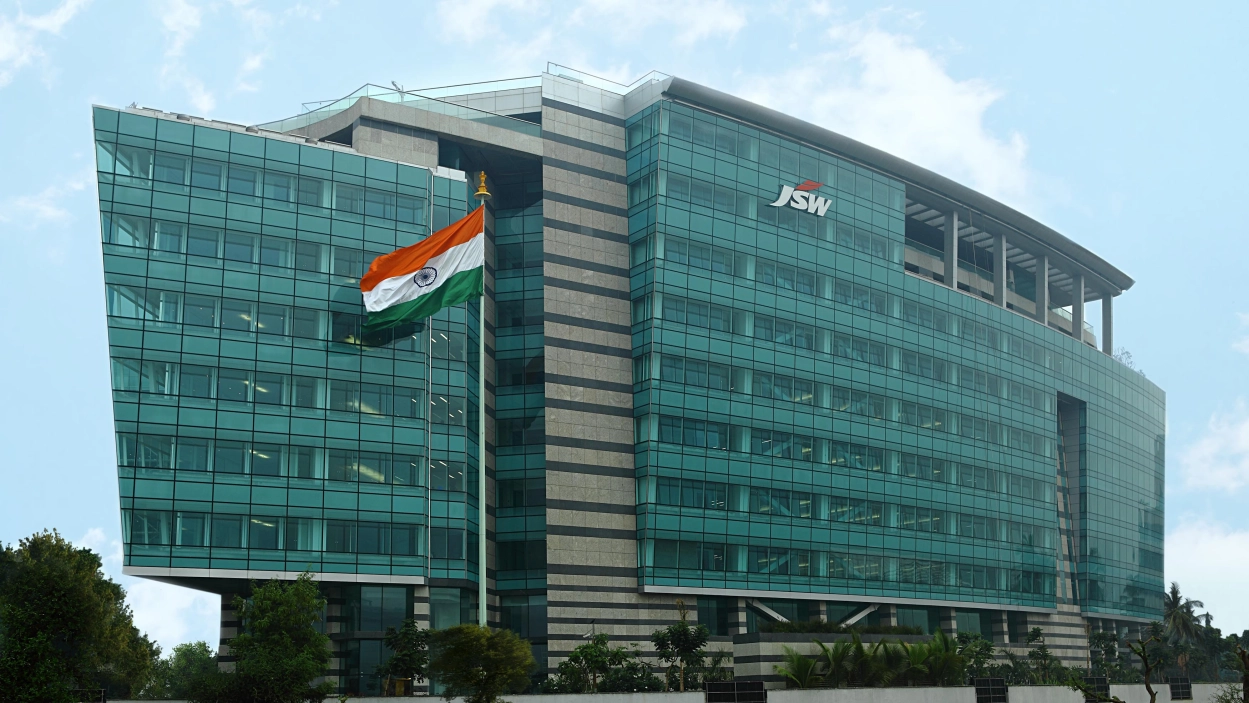
JSW Group headquarters

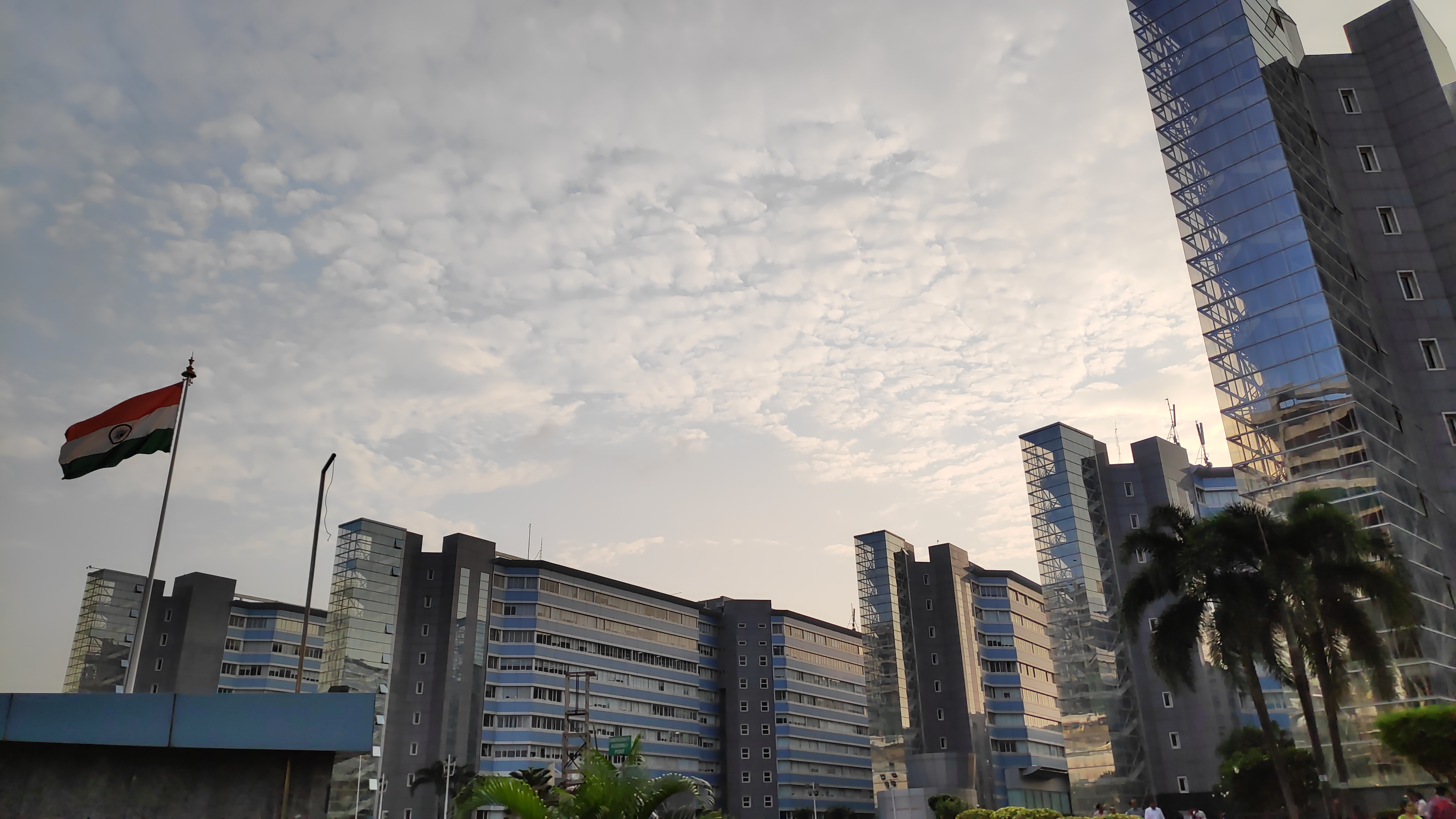
Bharat Diamond Bourse

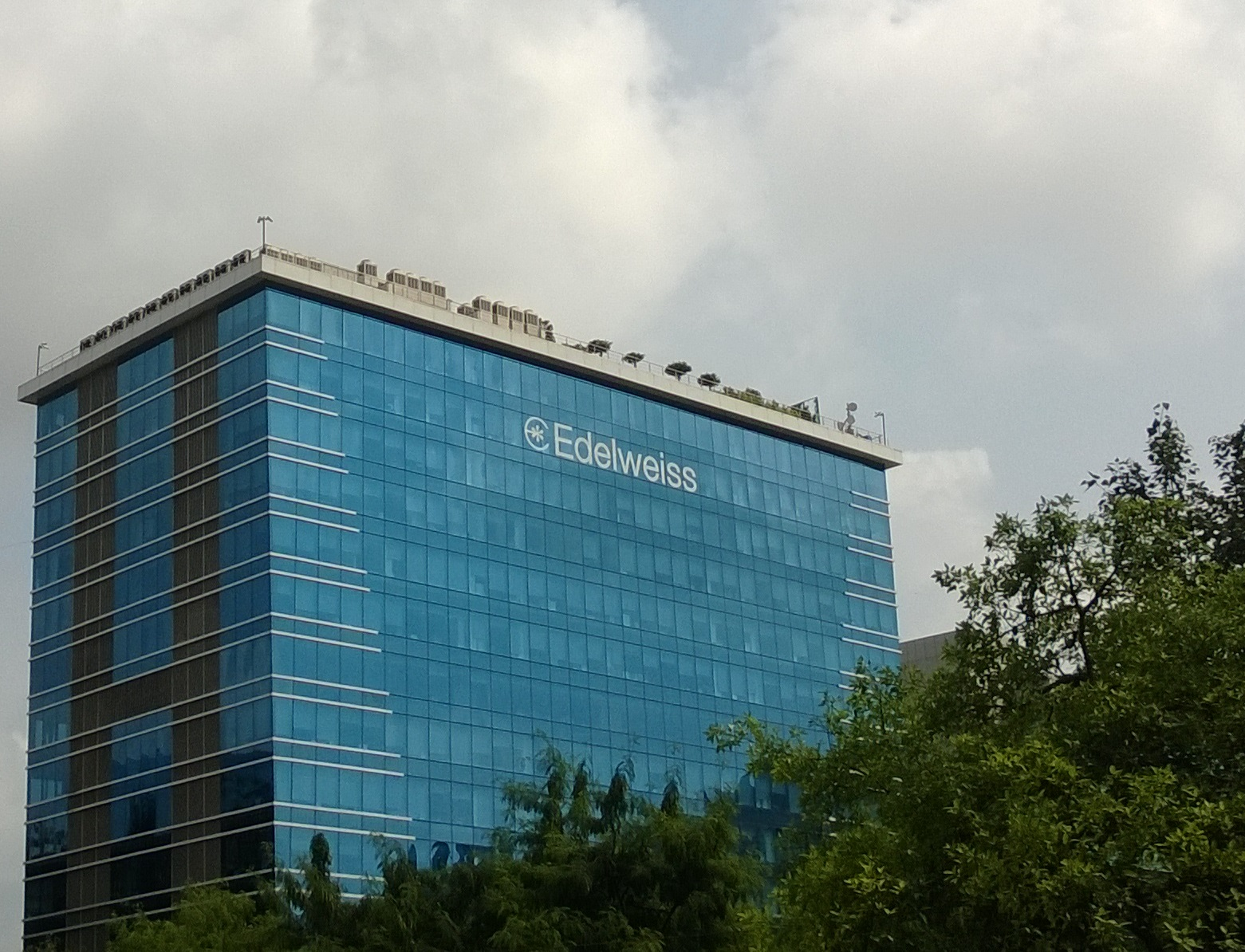
Edelweiss Tower

The Bandra Kurla Complex is a commercial area located in the Bandra East area of the city of Mumbai, the financial capital of India. It is a prominent upscale hub and is considered to be one of the most expensive neighbourhoods in the world. According to MMRDA, the complex is the first of a series of "growth centres" created to "arrest further concentration" of offices and commercial activities in eastern parts of Mumbai.

== Subjects ==
BKC houses a number of commercial buildings including Jammu & Kashmir Bank, National Business Centre, National Stock Exchange, SEBI, SIDBI, ONGC, Punjab National Bank, NABARD, Nita Mukesh Ambani Cultural Centre, ICICI Bank, Canara Bank, Citibank, Bank of Baroda, State Bank of India, Bank of India, Kotak Mahindra Bank, Bandhan Bank, Bharat Diamond Bourse, Unit Trust of India, Dhirubhai Ambani International School, IL&FS, Amazon.com, Spotify, Asian Heart Institute, Dow Chemicals, American School of Bombay, Institute of Chartered Accountants of India, Fortune 2000, Jio World Centre, Jio World Drive and Jio World Garden. It also hosts the first Apple Store in India called the "Apple BKC".

It also is home to the Mumbai Cricket Association's cricket ground, the Consulate General of the United States, Mumbai and the British Deputy High Commission, Rustomjee Seasons, Hubtown Sunstone, Ten BKC, Kalpataru Magnus, Kalpataru Sparkle, and Rustomjee Oriana.

More than 400,000 (4 lakh) people work in various offices throughout the BKC.

It covers 370 hectares of once low-lying land on either side of the Mithi river, Vakola Nalla and Mahim Creek. The area had poor surface drainage and was severely affected by pollution in the Mahim Creek. One of the important features of the channelisation of Mithi river and Vakola Nalla was to improve their water-carrying capacity and reduce pollution. Mithi River for about 4.5 km of its length from Mahim Causeway to C.S.T. Road Bridge and its tributary Vakola Nalla, for 2.5 km of its length, have been channelised for an average 60 m and 40 m bed widths respectively, thereby improving the hydraulic features of these two important water courses in the BKC area.

The commercial development in BKC includes private and government offices (state and central), banks, wholesale establishments, etc. and will provide ultimately about 2,000,000 jobs in the area. The MMRDA has so far developed 19 hectares of marshy land in the 'E' Block where a number of office buildings have been constructed. These buildings together provide an office space of 174,000 square metres with a potential to accommodate 17,400 jobs. An Urban Plaza and Park named 'CITY PARK' has been developed on an area of about 22,500 square metres in this block.

In recent years, BKC overtook South Mumbai to become the third most-prominent business district in Maharashtra, after Mumbai's Nariman Point and Cuffe Parade. However, a lack of public transportation options in the area (including rail, metro, etc.), in addition to the soft marshland on which BKC is based, have challenged the further development of the area, such as the construction of skyscrapers and high-rises. Despite this, it is expected by 2030 that BKC and Parel will be more prominent commercial hubs than Nariman Point and Cuffe Parade.

== G Block and International Finance and Business Center (IFBC) ==
Besides the development in 'E' Block, the focus of development of activities has also moved to the adjoining 'G' Block where a new International Finance and Business Center is planned.

=== Objectives ===
The main objective of International Finance and Business Centre (IFBC) planning is to create new office locations. In order to ensure some life in the area even after offer office hours, a mix of activities has also been envisaged.

=== Accessibility ===
The basic consideration of the IFBC plan is accessibility to the area. The considerations of accessibility and orientation have shaped the overall master plan of IFBC. It is a part of the 'G' Block of Bandra Kurla Complex, which is located between Bandra and Kurla, both of which are major railway stations and have railway terminals (Bandra Terminus and Lokmanya Tilak Terminus, respectively) in their vicinity on the Western and Central lines respectively, of the Mumbai Suburban Railway. In addition to the suburban railway, the upcoming Line II of Phase 1 of the Mumbai Metro project will pass through the IFBC and will have 4 stations near and within BKC (i.e., MMRDA, Income Tax Office, Bharat Nagar and Complex Road), other than Bandra (Metro) and Kurla (Metro) stations.

Other than the above rail links, BKC can also be accessed through the Western Express Highway, a major expressway in Mumbai, via the Kalanagar Junction and BKC Road, which passes through the IFBC. And also there is link road to connect Eastern express highway.

In 2019, the west side of BKC in the inside area started operation of a new flyover. It is called Chunabhatti-BKC flyover or just simply BKC Connector as it connects with the Eastern Express Highway. The bridge provides proximal access to Sewri-Chembur Road and vehicles can climb on the Eastern Freeway from Daya Shankar Chowk turning right from the link road or get to BKC just north from Sion all the way therefore more most business people working in the area or living in the area and commuting to South Bombay for work getting faster journeys and less travel time. The bridge passes over Mithi River and over Mumbai Suburban Railway's Central and Harbour line tracks and it acts as a bypass to areas like Kalanagar and Dharavi and the route is expected to reduce traffic congestion on the existing link roads. Entry on the bridge is only allowed for cars and few bus routes sometimes provide service on the overpass and trucks. However 2 and 3 wheelers, including bicycles, are restricted on this road, and can be penalized if caught, although bicycles are exempt from penalties due to non-provision in the Motor Vehicles Act and lack of signage to prevent their entry.

=== Land use ===
About 42 per cent of the land area of the plan is earmarked for commercial use and 14 per cent for housing. One of the important features of the area is preservation of large open spaces surrounding various public centers. This is expected to be the focal point of activities and a major attraction of the area. A large utility complex is proposed to be developed. It will provide space for various public and commercial utilities, small offices for professionals, car parks, bus stands and taxi stands. Parking demand expected in the area is about 15,000. To provide for such parking requirement, two level basement parking is permitted for all buildings. Public parking is also proposed in the form of multi-storied and underground garages.

=== Concert venues ===
In order to provide space in terms of open grounds for arranging various exhibitions, events etc., open plots have been made available on rent. These open plots collectively known as 'MMRDA Grounds' host most of the city's Trade Exhibitions, Music Concerts, Award Nights and Religious and Political Rallies. International Artists that have performed at the MMRDA grounds include Akon, 50 Cent, Beyoncé, Guns N' Roses, INXS, Iron Maiden, Michael Learns to Rock, Pitbull, Roger Waters, Bryan Adams, Scorpions, Mark Knopfler and Shakira.

BKC hosted Vodafone Speed Fest, an F1 Street Race featuring Lewis Hamilton on 16 September 2012.

The Global Citizen Festival was hosted at the MMRDA Grounds on 19 November 2016, headlined by Coldplay and Demi Lovato. The lineup also included Aamir Khan, Jay-Z and A.R. Rahman, among others.

=== Development till date and in future ===
A number of offices and residential buildings and three schools have been constructed and occupied. Construction of other buildings is in an advanced stage of completion. Most of the infrastructure services work including water supply, sewerage, telephone, gas, storm water, and electricity is completed. CNG and Petrol Pump outlet are operational. Mahim Nature Park is development in ‘H’ block of the complex.

== Transport ==
Mumbai Metro lines 2 and 3 will be in this area, which would be also integrated with Mumbai–Ahmedabad high-speed rail corridor's Mumbai Terminal.

== Sports ==
Bandra Kurla Complex Ground is a cricket ground. The ground normally hosts charity matches and some local matches. It is also home to the Mumbai Cricket Association. In 2009, India under-19s also practiced with Mike Young, an Australian fielding coach for the 2010 World Cup in New Zealand. The ground has also hosted women's ODI and T20I matches including two matches of World Cup 2013.
