= Vasant Gajera =

Indian businessman (born 1954)

- Born: 25 May 1954 (age 72); Amreli, Gujarat
- Occupation: Businessman
- Known for: Founder of Laxmi Diamond
- Parents: Haribhai Gajera; Shantaben Gajera
- Website: vasantgajera.com

Vasant Gajera (born 25 May 1954) is an Indian businessman. He is the founder of Laxmi Diamond Group, a diamond manufacturing and exporting company.

Born in Amreli, Gujarat, he moved to Surat in 1968 at the age of 14. There, he studied diamond cutting and polishing before starting Laxmi Diamond. Gajera and 4 other executives at Laxmi were arrested in 2018 on forgery and cheating charges; as of 2026, the investigation is still in progress.

== Laxmi Diamond ==
Gajera started Laxmi Diamond in 1972, joined shortly thereafter by his younger brothers. They hired Gabi Tolkowsky as company spokesman in 2005. The company imports rough diamonds, processes and exports polished diamonds to other nations. Since 1995, Laxmi Diamond has been a sightholder of the Diamond Trading Company (DTC).

== Arrest and investigation ==
Gajera, along with his brother, Chuni, was arrested on 22 March 2018 under allegations that he used forged documents to unlawfully usurp land. He was charged on 5 April 2018. The complaint dates back to 2003, with Gajera allegedly building a wall around the illegally acquired land. Initially, police failed to act upon the complaint, but after the complainant, Vajubhai Malani, contested the decision in the high court, the court ordered the police to charge Gajera; the. As of 2026, prosecution of Gajera and other 4 former executives of Laxmi was ongoing; the group was accused of forgery and cheating (law), illicit collection of Rs 1,928.39 crore (200 million USD) in violation of anti-siphoning laws.
