= Hari Krishna Exports =

Indian diamond conglomerate

Hare Krishna Exports Pvt. Ltd.
- Type: Public
- Industry: Diamond Manufactures and Exporters
- Founded: 1992
- Founders: Savji Dholakia
- Headquarters: Ghatkopar, Mumbai, India
- Number of locations: chandigarh Surat
- Area served: Worldwide
- Key people: Ravji Dholakia (Chairman); Brijesh Dholakia (CEO)
- Products: Diamonds and Jewellery
- Revenue: ▲US$ 2.1 million (Rs. 1000 crores)
- Owner: Savji Dholakia and family
- Number of employees: 100 (as of 2023)
- Divisions: Raw Diamond Procurement; Diamond Polishing; Diamond Marketing & Sales
- Website: www.hk.co

Hari Krishna Exports Pvt. Ltd., also known as HK, is an Indian diamond conglomerate, headquartered in The Capital, Bandra Kurla Complex, Mumbai, India. It was established in 1992 by Savji Dholakia and his three brothers. The company has manufacturing units at Surat in Gujarat and its marketing and sales office in Mumbai. HK exports polished diamonds to 79 countries. Currently, the company manufactures over 40,000 carats of diamonds every month (equivalent to 500,000 carats annually).

According to a Times of India report in January 2017, Hari Krishna Exports was reportedly involved in a case concerning alleged evasion charges of approximately ₹16.66 crore by the Employees' Provident Fund Organisation.

== History ==
In 1992, HK began its operations as a diamond cutting and polishing unit in Surat, starting with a modest setup comprising a few machines and employees. It later expanded its operations to Mumbai to meet the increasing demand for raw diamonds.

In 2005, HK introduced its jewelry brand - KISNA. It now stands as one of the most widely distributed diamond jewelry brands in India, with its products available in over 6,250 jewelry outlets. KISNA offers a diverse range of designs encompassing rings, earrings, pendants, necklaces, bangles, bracelets, and nose pins. It utilizes VVS diamonds and 18k hallmarked gold in its creations. From 2007 to 2008, HK experienced a growth rate of 49%, achieving a turnover of ₹ 1,025 crores (US$ 260 million at that time).

In 1994, diamond exports surged following a referral from an Israeli client to international clients. By 2001, the export company began trading and manufacturing diamonds ranging from 0.18 Carat to 0.96 Carat. In the fiscal year 2002–03, Hari Krishna Exports Pvt. Ltd. recorded a remarkable growth rate of 200%.

The company is engaged in both diamond jewelry manufacturing and export through H.K. Designs and Unity Jewels. H.K. Jewels Pvt. Ltd. serves the domestic market, while Kisna Diamond Jewellery, a pan-India brand, is distributed through more than 480 distributors to over 6500 retail outlets.

== Controversy ==
The company received media attention for "gifting" its employees cars, jewellery, and homes as bonuses on Diwali. In 2014, it gifted 491 cars, 525 pieces of diamond jewellery and 200 apartments worth ₹50 crore (US$5.2 million). In 2016, the company gifted 1260 cars and 400 apartments. The company gifted 600 cars in 2018. The claims were disputed by the Mera News portal, which reported that the employees are paid a salary on the cost to company basis, and the down payment of the 'gifts' are sourced from the amount deducted from the salary under the bonus title. The cars are brought under the company's name, and the employees have to sign a job bond of 5 years. The company benefits from the bulk discount and tax credit on the cars.

In December 2016, the company was issued notice by the Employee Provident Fund Organisation's (EPFO) Surat regional branch for violating the Employees Provident Funds and Miscellaneous Provisions Act, 1952, and Factory Act after two years of investigation. The company had registered only 17 employees under Employee Provident Fund (EPF) despite employing 3165 people then. It had not paid EPF to employees for several years. The EPFO ordered the company to deposit ₹16.6 crore (US$1.7 million) with 12% annual interest and 25% annual damage penalty.

== Recognition ==
- The Gem and Jewellery Export Promotion Council (GJEPC)'s Annual Exports Award for the Year 2002–03 to 2011-12 (for ten consecutive years).
- The GJEPC's "Most Innovative Company of the Year" Award for the year 2012–13.
- The Stevie International Business Award for the "Management of the year 2012-13"
- The Stevie International Business Award - 2014 "Company of the Year – Manufacturing" and "Fastest-Growing Company of the Year (Asia, Australia and New Zealand)"
- JNA Award "Outstanding Enterprise of the Year" in the year 2014.
- Mr. Savji Dholakia, the founder and chairman of Hari Krishna Exports, is awarded the 4th highest civilian award of India, called ‘Padma Shri,’ from the Hon’ble President of India, Ram Nath Kovind in 2022.
