= Mavjinjava =

- Village
- Location in Mavjinjava, Amreli, Gujarat, India Mavjinjava (India)
- Coordinates: 21.5502152°N 70.9069633°E
- Country: India
- State: Gujarat
- District: Amreli
- Sub-District: Bagasara

Government
  - Body: Gram panchayat

Population (2011)
  - Total: 3,754

Languages
  - Official: Gujarati, Hindi, English
- Time zone: UTC+5:30 (IST)
- PIN: 365456
- Telephone code: 02796
- Vehicle registration: GJ 14
- Website: gujaratindia.com

Mavjinjava is a small village near Bagasara in the Amreli district of the Saurashtra region in the state of Gujarat, India. There is a population of around 3,754 people in Mavjinjava. More than 3000 people live outside of Manjinjava in places like Surat, Ahmedabad & Mumbai.

== History ==
It is believed that during the year 534 AD Mavjinjava existed and was known as Mavji and then Mavjinjava. The village is named in ancient Gujrati as Mavjinjava (માવજીંજવા). Initially Mavjinjava was the part of the former Gaekwad of Baroda during the Gaekwad regime in 1886. After Indian independence in 1947, the village became the part of Bombay State and then a separate village in Gujarat State after the division of Bombay State in 1956 into Gujarat and Maharashtra.

== Geography ==
Most part of the area is called Balapur Road stretching from the main bus stand to Mahesh Pan Center. Other areas are Khodiyar Plot, Bagasara Plot, Kalwachouk, Pati Khetar Road, Hanumanpara etc.

Mavjinjava is a small village in Kāthiāwār in Gujarāt. The Kāthiāwār peninsula of western India, is in Gujarāt State. The peninsula extends southwest into the Arabian Sea and is bounded on the northwest by the Gulf of Kachchh and on the southeast by the Gulf of Khambhāt. The area of Mavjinjava is about 60,000 km² (about 23,000 sq mi).

=== Climate ===
Climate data for Mavjinjava
Month	Jan	Feb	Mar	Apr	May	Jun	Jul	Aug	Sep	Oct	Nov	Dec	Year
Record high °C (°F)	36 (97)	39 (102)	43 (109)	44 (111)	47 (117)	45 (113)	42 (108)	38 (100)	40 (104)	41 (106)	40 (104)	37 (99)	47 (117)
Mean daily maximum °C (°F)	28 (82)	30 (86)	35 (95)	38 (100)	40 (104)	37 (99)	32 (90)	31 (88)	33 (91)	35 (95)	32 (90)	29 (84)	33 (92)
Mean daily minimum °C (°F)	10 (50)	12 (54)	16 (61)	21 (70)	23 (73)	25 (77)	25 (77)	23 (73)	22 (72)	20 (68)	16 (61)	12 (54)	19 (66)
Record low °C (°F)	−0.55 (31.01)	1 (34)	6 (43)	10 (50)	16 (61)	20 (68)	18 (64)	20 (68)	16 (61)	12 (54)	7 (45)	2 (36)	−0.55 (31.01)
Average precipitation mm (inches)	0 (0)	0 (0)	0 (0)	0 (0)	10 (0.4)	100 (3.9)	270 (10.6)	120 (4.7)	80 (3.1)	10 (0.4)	0 (0)	0 (0)	590 (23.1)
Average rainy days (≥ 0.1 in)	0.2	0.4	0.2	0.1	1.2	6.5	13.4	7.8	5.2	1.3	0.6	0.3	37.2
Average relative humidity (%)	42	40	43	44	50	66	79	82	77	57	47	45	56
Source: Weatherbase

Mavjinjava has a semi-arid climate, with hot, dry summers from mid-March to mid-June and the wet monsoon season from mid-June to October, when the village receives 500 mm of rain on average. The months from November to February are mild, the average temperature being around 20 °C, with low humidity.

== Culture ==
The people in Mavjinjava are predominantly vegetarians and are vehemently against any form of hunting.

=== Landmarks ===
Mavjinjava has many historical landmarks to visit, including:

- The K.Lal's Home,
- Sri Nirdoshanand Saraswati Ji Maharaj Ashram,
- Ramji Mandir,
- Sri Bal Krishna Haveli,
- Shivalaya Mandir,
- Karmanpir Mandir.

=== Sports ===
Cricket is a very famous sport in this village.

=== Media ===
Many media found in this village.

==== Newspapers ====
Morning newspapers available in the Gujarati language are Gujarat Samachar, Sandesh, Divya Bhaskar, Avadh Times etc.

==== Satellite Television ====
- Airtel digital TV, Dish TV, Reliance Digital TV, TATA Play.

==== Television ====
Prasar Bharti telecasts DD National (DD1), DD Gujarati (DD11) from Doordarshan Kendra, Rajkot. BSNL Telephone Exchange provides PSTN, mobile, wireless local loop and broadband services. Private companies like Idea cellular, Reliance Infocomm, Bharti Airtel and Vodafone India also provide mobile and broadband services.

==== Telecommunications ====
- Airtel, BSNL, Idea Cellular, Reliance Mobile, Vodafone, Jio.

=== Festival ===
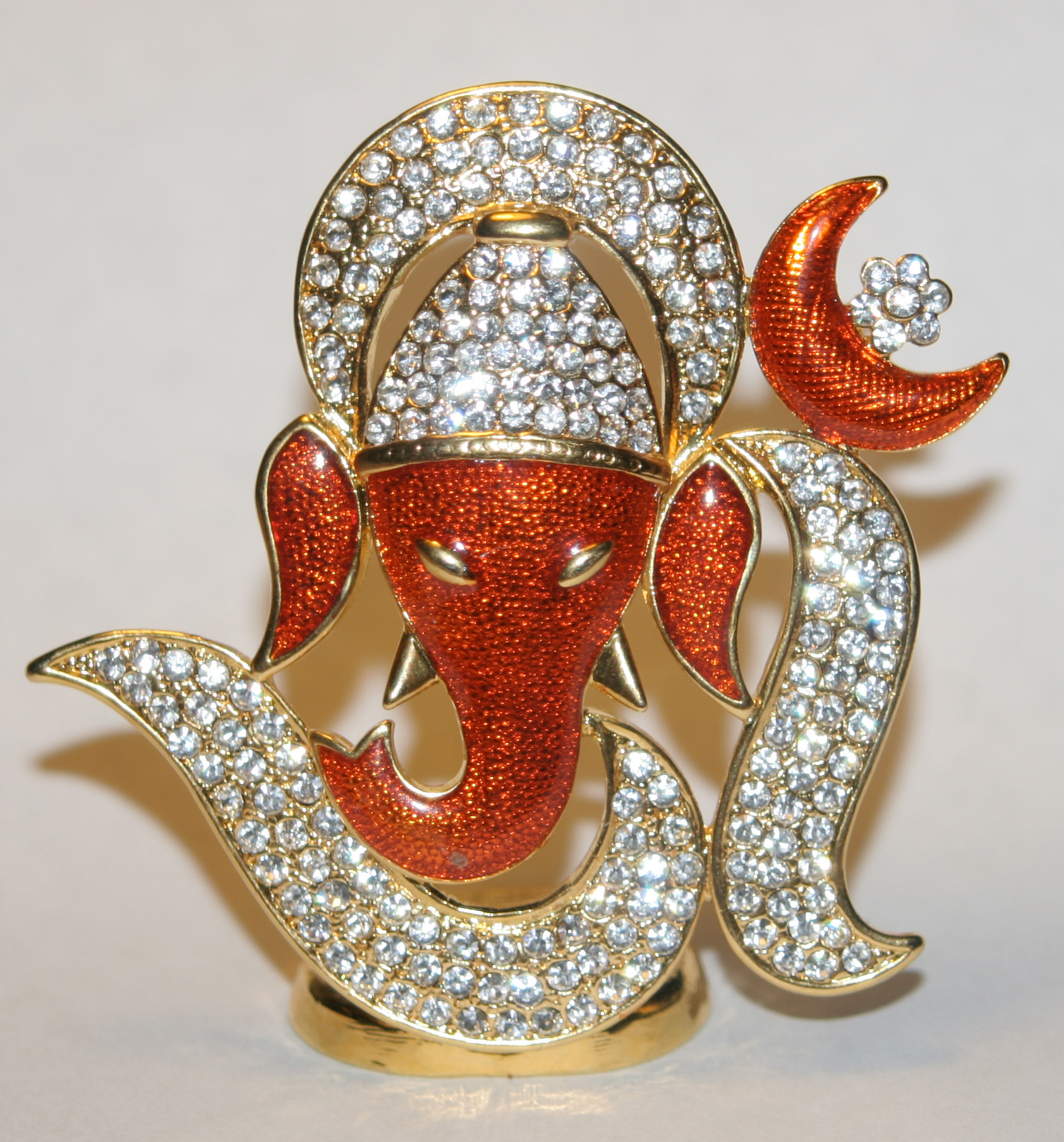
Ganesh Chaturthi, a popular festival in Mavjinjava., involves worship of Ganesha.

Garba, a dance form, is popular both with men and women and is performed during the Navratri festival. The dance starts before midnight and continues until dawn. Mata Ambe, who rides a Lion, has a special reverential status with any highly religious Gujarati. The 'Janmastami Mela' organizes by for five days at the Bagasara city Grounds to celebrate Janmastami. Diwali is the New Year for Hindus and people celebrate by doing Ma Laxmi Pujan. People clean and paint their houses and purchase new clothes to wear on New Year's Day. Dhuleti is the colour festival and Mahashivratri is God Shiva's day. People also celebrate Uttarayan (Makar Sankranti) on 14 January by flying kites from their terraces. Other holidays are Ganesh Utsava, Ram Navami, Mahavir Jayanti etc.

== Economy ==
Mavjinjava village economy depends on agriculture.

=== Banks ===
- Bank of Baroda.
  - Karmanpir Street.
- Amreli Jilla Madhya Sahakari Bank.
  - Bagasara Road, Near Khodal Dham temple.

== Education ==
- Mavjinjava had many small children Play House.
- Mavjinjava had one Primary School
  - Shree Mavjinjava Primary School
- Mavjinjava had one Secondary School
  - Shree K.Lal High School

== Transport ==
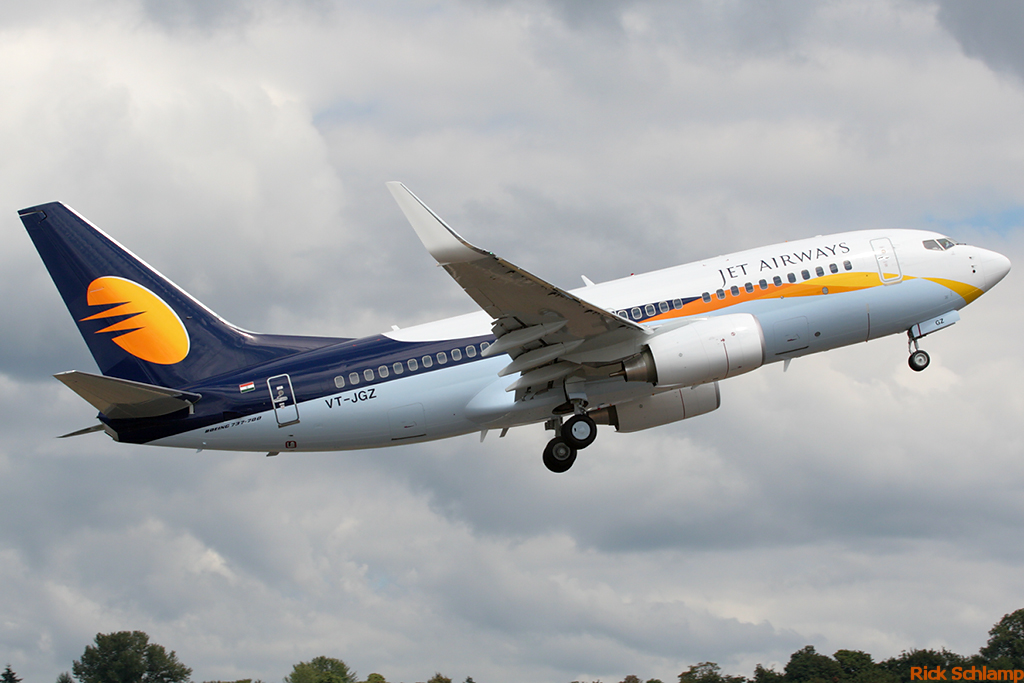
Jet Airways plane at Rajkot.

Mavjinjava village is connected to major Indian cities by road.

=== Roads and Highways ===
Mavjinjava village is very well connected with Gujarat State roads.

==== Distances between other Cities ====
Distances from Mavjinjava to...

- Bagasara ➤ 9.0 km.
- Amreli ➤ 41.1 km.
- Junagadh ➤ 70.9 km.
- Rajkot ➤ 102 km.
- Bhavnagar ➤ 159 km.
- Bhuj ➤ 334 km.
- Ahmedabad ➤ 281 km.
- Vadodara ➤ 321 km.
- Surat ➤ 461 km.
- Mumbai ➤ 723 km.
- Pune ➤ 855 km.
- Bangalore ➤ 1,689 km.
- Kolkata ➤ 2,329 km.
- Delhi ➤ 1,210 km.
- Jaipur ➤ 950 km.
- Chennai ➤ 2,042 km.
- Goa ➤ 1,310 km.
- Srinagar ➤ 1,931 km.

=== Rail and Internal Transport ===
Nearly Railway Station is Amreli, Junagadh and Rajkot.

=== Airport ===
Nearly national airport is Rajkot and international airport is Ahmedabad and Mumbai.

== Attractions ==
- Sri Swami Nirdoshanand Saraswatiji Maharaj Ashram
- Ramji Mandir
- Sri Bal Krishna Haveli
- Shivalaya Mandir
- Karmanpir Mandir
- Swaminarayan Mandir
- Balaji Hanuman Mandir
- Hanuman Deri
- Khodiyarmata Mandir
- Khodiyar Dham
- Sanatan Gaushala
- Monsoon time Mavjinjava River.

== Demographics ==
Religion in Mavjinjava
Religion	Percent
Hinduism	99.99%
Others	0.1%

As of 2011 India census, Mavjinjava had a population of 3,754.
