= Arun Tiwari =

Indian scientist (born 1955)

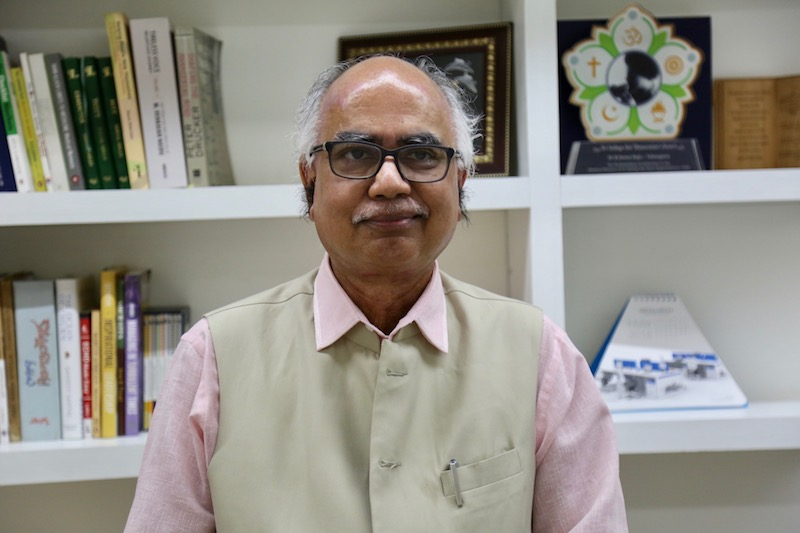
- Born: 10 February 1955 (age 71); Meerut, Uttar Pradesh, India
- Education: G. B. Pant University of Agriculture and Technology
- Occupations: Missile scientist, author, professor

Arun Kumar Tiwari (born 10 February 1955) is an Indian missile scientist, author, and professor. He has written several books and co-authored five books with Dr. APJ Abdul Kalam, including Wings of Fire, the autobiography of Dr. APJ Abdul Kalam, former president of India. Published in 1999, Wings of Fire has become a modern classic with over 30 reprints selling over a million copies and was translated into 18 languages.

== Early life and career ==
Born in Meerut, Uttar Pradesh, after completing his masters in mechanical engineering from GB Pant University for Agriculture & Technology, Tiwari joined Defence Research & Development Organisation (DRDO) in 1982 as a missile scientist. He spent the next 15 years involved in India's military missile development efforts. He developed India's first Titanium air bottle used in ‘Trishul’ and ‘Akash’ missiles and designed Airframes for both the missiles.

In 1992 Dr. APJ Abdul Kalam appointed Tiwari as the Program Director to develop civilian spin-offs of Defence Technologies. Arun Tiwari developed India's first Coronary stent with Cardiologist Dr. B Soma Raju well known as Kalam-Raju Stent. This led to the creation of Care Foundation and later the Care Hospitals, Hyderabad. Tiwari was awarded the Defence Technology Spin-Off Award in 1998 for his role in developing the stent.

He is also credited for structuring and setting up the Pan-African e-Network project which is India's first satellite-based telemedicine system. He set up the first link of the project and established Pan-Africa e-Network of Telecommunications Consultants India Ltd (TCIL) that now connects Universities and Hospitals across the African continents with their Indian counterparts.

From 2002 to 2007, Tiwari was a member of the advisory team to President of India, Dr APJ Abdul Kalam.

As of 2018, he was Secretary of Care Foundation and the Platinum Jubilee Mentor of CSIR – IICT.

As of July 2018, Tiwari taught at the School of Management Sciences, University of Hyderabad, as an adjunct professor.

In March 2019 Tiwari was invited to speak at TEDx MVSR Engineering college in Hyderabad.

== Bibliography ==
- Wings of Fire: An Autobiography by A P J Abdul Kalam, Arun Tiwari; Universities Press, 1999
- Guiding Souls: Dialogues on the Purpose of Life by A.P.J. Abdul Kalam, Arun Tiwari; Ocean Books Pvt. Ltd, 2005
- You Are Born To Blossom: Take My Journey Beyond by A P J Abdul Kalam and Arun Tiwari; Ocean Books, 2008
- Feeding The Forgotten Poor: Perspectives of an Agriculturist by William Dar & Arun Tiwari; Orient Blackswan, 2011
- Squaring the Circle: Seven Steps to Indian Renaissance by A.P.J. Abdul Kalam, Arun Tiwari; Universities Press, 2013
- Greening The Grey by William Dar & Arun Tiwari; Rajpal Publishing, 2014
- Transcendence: My Spiritual Experiences with Pramukh Swamiji by A P J Abdul Kalam with Arun Tiwari; HarperCollins Publishers, June 2015
- A.P.J. Abdul Kalam: A Life by Arun Tiwari; HarperCollins India, 2015
- The Life and Times of Gautam Buddha by Arun K Tiwari; Prabhat Prakashan, 2016
- A Modern Interpretation of Lokmanya Tilak's Gita Rahasya by Arun Tiwari; Sakal Paper Pvt Ltd, 2017
- India 3.0: The Rising Billion by Arun Tiwari; HarperCollins Publishers, March 2019
- Diamonds Are Forever, So Are Morals Autobiography of Govind Dholakia by Arun Tiwari & Kamlesh Yagnik; India Penguin Enterprise, March 2022
