= Wings of Fire (autobiography) =

1999 book by A. P. J. Abdul Kalam and Arun Tiwari

- Cover for A P J Abdul Kalam's Wings of Fire
- Author: A P J Abdul Kalam, Arun Tiwari
- Cover artist: Photograph courtesy: The Week
- Subject: India's journey to self-reliance in technology
- Genre: Autobiography
- Publisher: Universities Press
- Publication date: 1999
- Media type: Print (paperback)
- Pages: 180 (paperback edition)
- ISBN: 81-7371-146-1 (paperback edition)
- OCLC: 41326410
- LC Class: Q143.A197 A3 1999

Wings of Fire is the 1999 autobiography of Indian aerospace scientist and former President of India, A. P. J. Abdul Kalam. It was written by Kalam and Arun Tiwari.

In Wings of Fire, Kalam examines his early life, effort, hardship, fortitude, luck and chance that eventually led him to lead Indian space research, nuclear and missile programs. Kalam started his career, after graduating from Aerospace engineering at Madras Institute of Technology, at Hindustan Aeronautics Limited and was assigned to build a hovercraft prototype. Later he moved to ISRO and helped establish the Vikram Sarabhai Space Centre and pioneered the first space launch-vehicle program. During the 1990s and early 2000, Kalam moved to the DRDO to lead the Indian nuclear weapons program, with particular successes in thermonuclear weapons development culminating in the operation Smiling Buddha and an ICBM Agni.

== Translations ==
The autobiography first published in English, has so far been translated and published in 14 languages including Hindi, Assamese, Bengali, Telugu, Tamil, Kannada, Malayalam, Odia, Marathi, Gujarati and Kashmiri. Outside of the major Indian languages, Wings of Fire was translated into Chinese (titled Huo Yi, by Ji Peng), and into French and English by various translators.

== Introduction of A. P. J. Abdul Kalam ==
He was born on 15 October 1931, the son of a little educated boat owner in Rameswaram, Tamil Nadu. His father was also imam of the small mosque in Rameswaram. He had an unparalleled career as a defence scientist, culminating in the highest civilian award of India, Bharat Ratna. As chief of the country's defence research and development programmer, Kalam demonstrated a great, great potential for dynamics and innovations that existed in a seemingly moribund research establishment. This is the story of Kalam's own rise from obscurity and his personal and professional struggles, as well as the story of AGNI, TRISHUL, and NAG missiles that have become household names in India and that have raised the nation to the level of a missile power of international reckoning. Since independence, India has sought in various ways, self-realization, adulation, and success.

== Orientation ==
A.P.J. Abdul Kalam, the book begins with the childhood of Kalam's life. In the beginning, he introduces us to his family and tries to familiarize us with his birthplace Rameswaram. In childhood, he was a great admirer of his father, Jainulabdeen. He was a man of great wisdom and kindness, and Pakshi Lakshmana Sastry, a close friend of his father and the head priest of the Rameswaram Temple. He had an ideal helpmate in his mother, Ashiamma. He was also influenced by his close friend, Ahmed Jalaluddin; he was about 15 years older than Kalam. With his friend, he talked about spiritual matters. This shows that he believed in spirituality and also believed in God or Khuda. He always went to Lord Shiva's temple with his friends.

In the later part of the opening chapters, he introduces his cousin Samsuddin, his school teachers, and all the people who have felt any difference amongst them. Here he expresses one event, which happened in his school days, a new teacher at his school, could not stomach a Hindu Priest's son sitting with a Muslim boy. In accordance with our social ranking as the new teacher saw it, I was asked to go and sit on the backbench. I felt very sad, and so did my parents about the incident. Lakshmana Sastry summoned the teacher, and in our presence, told the teacher that he should not spread the poison of social inequality and communal intolerance in the minds of innocent children.

He completed his school education in the Rameswaram Elementary School in Rameswaram and later on studied at Schwartz high school in Ramanathapuram. In 1950, he joined St. Joseph's College Trichi, to study for the B.Sc degree course when he realized that physics was not his subject. Then, at last, he applied to Madras Institute of Technology. He or his family could not afford to spend that much money on the course at Madras Institute of Technology. Zohara, his sister stood with him. When he had a specific branch of aeronautical engineering, the goal was very clear in his mind at that time. And he tried to communicate with different kinds of people. At Madras Institute of Technology, their teachers shaped his thoughts, Sponder, Kal Pandalai, and Narasingalu Rao. Each of them had carried distinct personalities. Last year of Madras Institute of Technology was a year of transition and had a great impact on his later life. From Madras Institute of Technology, he went out to Hindustan Aeronautics Limited, [HAL], at Bangalore as a trainer. There he worked on engine overhauling as part of a team. He had trained in radial engine-cum- drum operations. After the completion of engineering, he had applied for the Air Force and Directorate of Technical Development and Production –DTP and PC (Air) of the Ministry of Defence. But he was not selected in Air Force because he failed to pass the physical fitness standards. Later, he was appointed in DTP and PC (Air) as senior scientific Assistant on a basic salary only of Rs. 250 per month, in 1958. He had to create opportunities on his own. At this stage, he covered 32 eventful years of his life when he was just on the threshold of his career after graduation.

== Creation ==
The section 'Creation' traverses seven chapters, from chapters four to chapter ten; and covers Kalam's life and work for 17 years, from the year 1963 until 1980. It begins with his recollection of works at the Langley Research Center, NASA, in Houston, Virginia, U.S., and at other facilities in the US, including the Wallops Flight Facility at Wallops Island in East Coast of the United States, Virginia. At a NASA facility, he remembers to have seen a painting, prominently displayed in the lobby. The painting depicted a battle scene with a rocket flying in the background. On closer examination, he found that the painting depicted Tipu Sultan's army fighting the British. Kalam felt overjoyed to see an Indian glorified in NASA as a hero of rocketry warfare.

His association with the Satellite Launch Vehicle and related projects are vividly presented in the section 'Creation'. During the period covered under 'Creation', Kalam, in the year 1976, lost his father who lived up to 102 years of age. Kalam took the bereavement with courage and remembered these words written on the death of William Butler Yeats by his friend Auden, and his father:

Earth receive an honoured guest;
William Yeats is laid to rest:
In the prison of his days
Teach the free man how to praise.

A pleasant surprise came in the form of conferment of Padma Bhushan on Republic Day, 1981.

== Propitiation ==
Section Propitiation covers the period 1981 to 1991. This section covers the scientist's journey towards becoming the "missile man of India". In this section, his excellent leadership qualities as taking up the responsibility of shaping up the Guided Missile Development Program, are clearly visible. In this phase of the life, Kalam was responsible for the development of the 5 missiles – Prithvi, Trishul, Akash, Nag and Agni.

== Pictures ==
The book has 24 plates with photographs associated with the life and work of Kalam:

1. Ramanathapuram, from where Kalam had completed his high schooling.
2. Plate 8 shows his teachers at Schwartz High School.
3. Plate 9 shows Nandi, an indigenous hovercraft prototype.
4. Plate 10 shows the picture of a Church in Thumba, a place that was donated by the local Christian community to India's Space Research Centre.
5. Plate 11 shows him with Vikram Sarabhai.
6. Plate 12 shows an SLV-3 review meeting.
7. Plate 13 shows the presentation of members of the SLV-3 team.
8. Plate 14 is the first plate with a color photograph and shows Brahm Prakash inspecting SLV-3 in its final stage on integration, and plate 16 shows a colour photograph of SLV-3 on the launch pad.
9. Plate 15 shows him with Satish Dhawan and the then Prime Minister Indira Gandhi.
10. Plate 16 shows SLV-3 launch.
11. Plate 17 shows him receiving Padma Bhushan.
12. Plate 18 shows the successful launch of Prithvi, now a part of India's surface-to-surface weapons system.
13. Plate 19 shows Kalam standing by the side of the Agni missile, standing on its launch pad.
14. Plate 20 shows a cartoon by renowned cartoonist R.K. Laxman.
15. Plate 21 shows another cartoon on the failure of Agni Missile.
16. Plate 22 shows him after a successful launch of Agni Missile.
17. Plate 23 shows Kalam receiving the Bharat Ratna from K. R. Narayanan, then President of India.
