= The Capital (building) =

Building in Mumbai, India

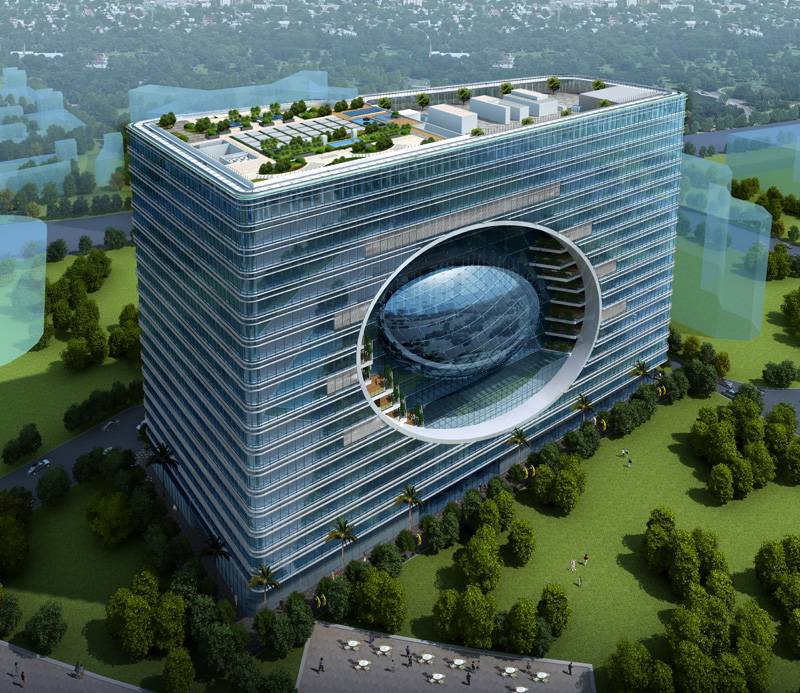
- Interactive map of the The Capital area

General information
- Status: Completed
- Location: Bandra Kurla Complex; Mumbai
- Construction started: 2012
- Cost: ₹ 320 crore($50 million)

Height
- Roof: 200 feet (61 m)

Technical details
- Floor count: 19
- Lifts/elevators: 18

Design and construction
- Architect: James Law (Cybertecture)
- Developer: Wadhwa Developers

The Capital is a 19-story building situated in Bandra Kurla Complex, Mumbai. The Capital was constructed by Wadhwa Developers. It's a commercial building with a mixture of offices, retail and hospitality spaces. It features the world’s largest automated car parking system, and is a green building, with Gold LEED certification.

The Capital is designed to be eco-friendly and energy-efficient. The building’s design results in a 35 per cent increased energy-efficiency over conventional buildings. The Capital’s architectural positioning and low solar co-efficient double-glazed glass exterior ensures that it gets adequate daylight of 79.2 per cent for regular occupied spaces. The quality of the air in the building is 30 per cent higher than the requirement specified by ASHRAE 62.1.
