= Diamonds Are Forever, So Are Morals =

Autobiography of Govind Dholakia

- Authors: Arun Tiwari; Kamlesh Yagnik
- Language: English
- Genre: Biography
- Publisher: Penguin Random House
- Publication date: 24 March 2022
- Publication place: India
- Media type: Print (hardcover)
- ISBN: 978-0670095728

Diamonds Are Forever, So Are Morals is a biography of Govind Dholakia, an Indian diamond merchant, written by Arun Tiwari and Kamlesh Yagnik.

== Publication ==
The book was published in 2022 by Penguin Enterprise, an imprint of Penguin Random House. In 2023, the book was translated into Gujarati language.

== Reception ==
In the foreword, Professor Bhikhu Parekh of the House of Lords praised the autobiography's exceptional qualities, noting: "Not surprisingly, few autobiographies succeed in avoiding them. Mahatma Gandhi, one of the first Indians to attempt an autobiography, was acutely aware of this and expressed his dilemma in the foreword to his autobiography...In the light of what I have said so far, Govind Dholakia's autobiography is a remarkable piece of writing." Parekh further elaborated on the book's portrait of its subject: "An autobiography is meant to reveal the innermost springs of action and self-conception of the author. In this autobiography, we meet a fine human being, one who is warm-hearted, independently minded, thoughtful, decisive, concerned with those who are weak and vulnerable, proud of his workers whom he associates with the conduct of his business, committed to his extended family, and surprising in a businessperson, a lover of Sanskrit. It is common to think that a successful businessperson is rarely a morally decent human being. This autobiography shows the opposite and affirms the old maxim Yogah Karmasu Kaushalam (Yoga is being successful at managing one's life)."

The Hindu Business Line wrote in a review "The life story of diamond baron, Govindbhai Dholakia, 73, gives an inspiring insight about a common man’s triumph in realising the dreams." The Asian Age said that "After reading the biography, one is left marvelling at the obvious wisdom of this singularly successful individual, who spawned a sprawling enterprise and an equally large extended family comprising about 1,500 members." The Deccan Chronicle noted the narrative as "disjointed, like a series of recordings stitched together to somehow make a whole." They however said it had merit despite these issues.

Outlook India wrote in a review "The autobiography treads a fine balance between Dholakia’s spiritual self and his work karma and will certainly intrigue some young get rich quick entrepreneurs to flip through it." The book was also endorsed by Indian prime minister Narendra Modi, who praised its "nuggets of inspiring information" in the text, saying that he felt it would be a "source of inspiration" for future generations.
