= K Lal =

Indian magician

K. Lal
- Born: Kantilal Girdharilal Vora; April 10, 1924; Mavjinjava, Bagasara (now in Amreli district, Gujarat, India)
- Died: 23 September 2012 (aged 88); Ahmedabad, Gujarat
- Other names: Lalsaab
- Occupation: Magician
- Spouse: Pushpa Vora
- Children: Harshad Vora (K Lal Jr.); Priti Vasa; Sonal Shah
- Website: www.klal.com

Kantilal Girdharilal Vora (10 April 1924 – 23 September 2012), popularly known as K. Lal, was an Indian magician.

== Biography ==
K. Lal was born on 10 April 1924 in Bagasara (now in Amreli district, Gujarat, India) in a jain family of Girdharlal Vora and Muliben. His uncle Lalchandbhai had a Khadi clothes shop in Calcutta who had entrusted it to his father when he joined Indian independence movement. The shop was burned down in riots so K. Lal had to work as a hawker. He rebuilt their clothes shop later and worked there K. Chhotalal Co.

He started his career as a magician in 1950 from Calcutta. His first show was held at Roxy Cinema in Calcutta. He was popular for his innovative tricks. He had evolved his tricks with technology. He used to spread social messages and moral lessons through his tricks. In a career spanning 62 years, he staged over 22,479 shows around the world, performing his last show in July 2012 in H K College Hall in Ahmedabad.

He returned to Gujarat in 1990. He died on 23 September 2012 at his home in Ahmedabad after prolonged illness at the age of 88.

K. Lal married Pushpa Vora and had a son Harshad (also known as K. Lal Junior) and two daughters Priti and Sonal. They were married and settled in Chennai and Kolkata.

== Appearances in media ==
K Lal Senior and Junior appear prominently in a book entitled Net of Magic by Lee Siegel, a writer and professor of religion at the University of Hawaii. The work, which combines fiction and nonfiction, contains, among other elements, Siegel's lengthy account of meetings with and descriptions of the two magicians.
