= Savji Dholakia =

Indian businessman (born 1962)

Padmashri Savjibhai Dhanjibhai Dholakia
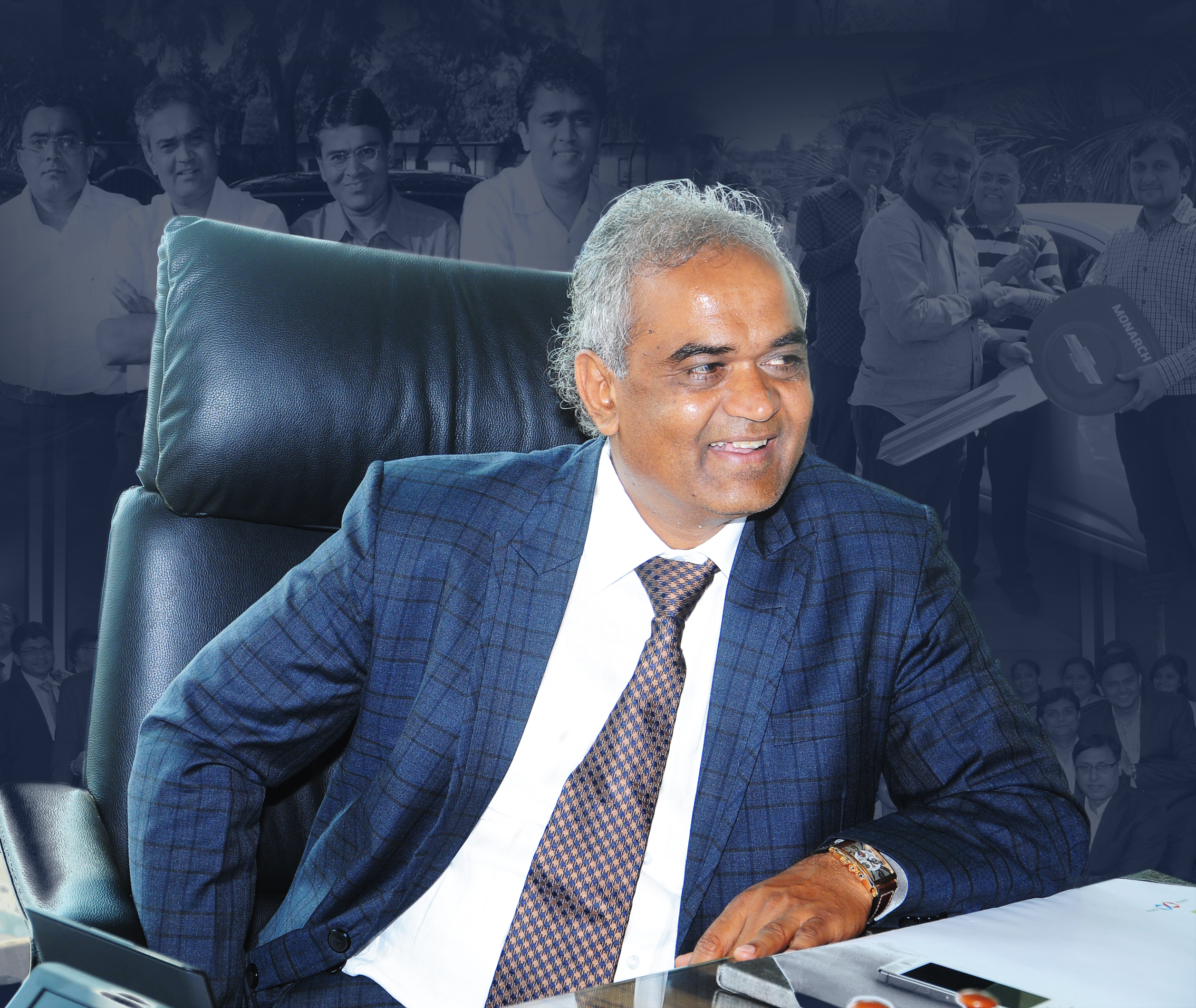
- Dholakia in December 2014
- Born: 12 April 1962 (age 64); Dudhala village, Amreli district, Gujarat, India
- Citizenship: India
- Occupation: Founder of Hari Krishna Exports
- Known for: Lake Development
- Awards: Padma Shri (2022)
- Website: savjidholakia.com

Savji Dhanji Dholakia (born 12 April 1962) is an Indian businessman. He is the founder and chairman of Hari Krishna Exports, a diamond manufacturing and exporting company. He was awarded the Padma Shri in 2022.

== Biography ==
Savji Dholakia was born in a Leva Patel family in Dudhala, Amreli district, Gujarat. He studied until 4th standard and dropped out at the age of 13. He joined his paternal uncle's diamond business in Surat. Later his brothers Himmat and Tulsi also joined him, and they founded the diamond business in 1984. Their youngest brother Ghanshyam joined them and opened a diamond export office in Mumbai in 1992. The company grew and became a major diamond exporting company with 9000 employees by 2014.

== Career ==
Together with his brothers Himmat, Tulsi, and Ghanshyam, Dholakia founded Hari Krishna Exports in 1992. The company engages in the procurement, cutting, polishing, and exporting of diamonds. It has grown to employ over 9,000 individuals as of 2014 and has gained recognition in the international diamond market.

== Recognition ==
In 2022, Dholakia was awarded the Padma Shri by the Government of India, recognizing his contributions to both the diamond industry and his philanthropic work, particularly for his efforts in creating 75 lakes.
