= Lathi taluka =

Taluka in Gujarat, India

Lathi Taluka
- Taluka of Gujarat
- Country: India
- State: Gujarat
- District: Amreli
- Headquarters: Lathi

Population (2011)
  - Total: 132,914
  - Sex ratio: 965 ♂/♀
  - Literacy: 68.01%

Languages
  - Official: Gujarati, Hindi
- Time zone: UTC+5:30 (IST)
- Postal code: 365430
- Telephone code: +91-079
- Vehicle registration: GJ

Lathi Taluka is a geographical subdivision located in the Amreli district of the state of Gujarat, India. It is situated in the western part of the country and falls within the Saurashtra region. Lathi is the headquarters of the taluka.

== Demographics ==
According to 2011 Census, the Lathi Sub-District has a total of 25,930 households. The population of the sub-district stands at 1,32,914, comprising 67,654 males and 65,260 females. Among the residents, there are 14,456 children, with 7,726 being males and 6,730 females. The demographic composition includes 11,323 individuals belonging to Scheduled Castes, with 5,762 males and 5,561 females, and 735 individuals from Scheduled Tribes, consisting of 404 males and 331 females. In terms of education, with 90,508 individuals identified as literate. Among them, 50,455 are males, and 40,053 are females. On the other hand, 42,406 people are reported as illiterate, comprising 17,199 males and 25,207 females. In terms of occupation, there are 62,863 individuals engaged in various forms of work, including 41,234 males and 21,629 females. Conversely, 70,051 people are categorized as non-workers, with 26,420 males and 43,631 females.
