= Kalanagar =

Locality in Mumbai

- Urban
- Country: India
- State: Maharashtra
- City: Mumbai

Kalanagar is an upper-middle class locality situated in Bandra East, Mumbai. It is famous for being the residence of Shiv Sena founder late Shri Balasaheb Thackeray and his son former chief minister of Maharashtra Shri Uddhav Thackeray.

== History ==
The locality was established in 1960 due to the initiative of painter V N Adarkar and then Chief Minister Yashwantrao Chavan. The residents reclaimed the marshy land and soon 36 cottages sprung up to house painters including Balasaheb Thackeray, K. K. Hebbar, N. S. Bendre, P. A. Dhond, Damu Kenkre, Madhav Satavalekar and Bapurao Naik among others. Currently, more than 90 families live in the area.
