= Amreli =

- City
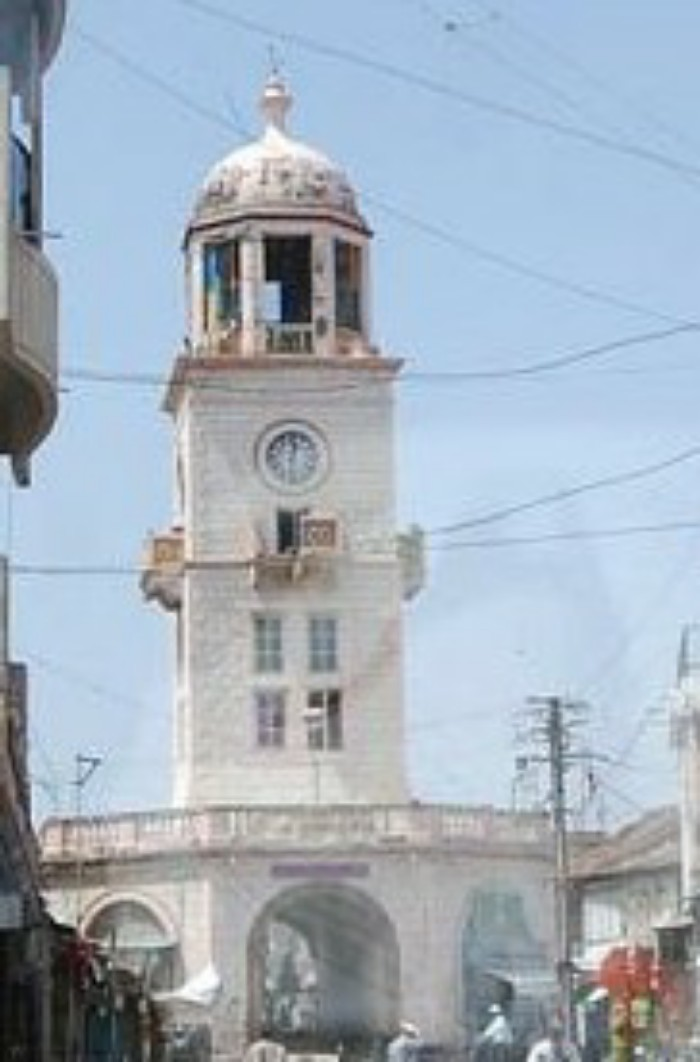
- Amreli Tower

- Location in Gujarat, India Amreli (India)
- Coordinates: 21°36′02″N 71°12′59″E
- Country: India
- State: Gujarat
- District: Amreli

Government
  - Body: Nagarpalika

Area
  - Total: 65 km^{2} (25 sq mi)
- Elevation: 128 m (420 ft)

Population (2011)
  - Total: 117,967
  - Estimate (2021): 146,014
  - Density: 1,815/km^{2} (4,700/sq mi)

Languages
  - Official: Gujarati
- Time zone: UTC+5:30 (IST)
- PIN: 365601, 365xxx, 364xxx (Amreli)
- Telephone code: 02792
- Vehicle registration: GJ-14
- Website: collectoramreli.gujarat.gov.in

Amreli is a city and a municipality in Amreli district in Indian state of Gujarat.

== History ==
It is believed that during 534 AD Amreli existed was formerly known as Anumanji, Amlik and then Amravati. The city is named in ancient Gujrati as Amarvalli. It is learnt from the inscription in the Nagnath temple that ancient name of Amreli city was Amarpalli. It was also called Girvanvalli. Amongst the remains of the ancient town are the memorial stones or paliya and foundations discovered in the fork of the Thebi and Vari rivers, and two old temples, Kamnath and Trimbaknath, on the west and east of the river.

In the eighteenth century only the west and south of modern Amreli, still called Juni or Old Amreli, were inhabited. The old inner fort, called Juna Kot, was used as a jail, and the Juna Masjid near it, belong to the old town. Modern Amreli dates from 1793, when Vakhatsingh of Bhavnagar sacked the neighboring Kathi possession of Chital and drove many of its people to Amreli and Jetpur.

Initially Amreli was the part of the former Gaekwad of Vadodara. Very little information on historical background is available for Amreli District prior to becoming part of erstwhile Baroda State.

When Damajirao Gaekwad, the Maratha general, came to Kathiawad in about 1730, three parties viz Kathis of Devalia carter, some Saiyads holding major part of Amreli. Obtained for the king of Delhi, and Faujdar of Junagadh, subordinate to suba of Ahmedabad, held sway. Damajirao and the Maratha forces defeated all three and levied tribute on all of them. Later Damajirao Gaekwad, established military camps at Amreli and Lathi in 1742–43 A.D. In 1800, the then Gaekwads appointed (1810–1815) Vithalrao Devaji (Dighe/Kathewad Diwanji) as Sar Subah of the Gaekwad's Kathiawad possessions. Vithalrao Devaji settled in Amreli and developed the city and its surrounding regions over the next 23 years. It was during this period that Amreli became a proper city. He built many works of public utility; among others, temples, offices, a market, and a dam for the water-supply of the town. It was under Amreli-Okhamandal division, one of four divisions of Baroda State.

During the Gaekwad regime in 1886, compulsory and free education policy was adopted in Amreli for the first time. After Indian independence in 1947, the district became the part of Saurashtra State which was later merged with Bombay State in 1956. After bifurcation of Bombay State in 1960 into Gujarat and Maharashtra, it became part of Gujarat under Amreli district.

== Climate ==
Climate data for Amreli (1991–2020, extremes 1973–present)
Month	Jan	Feb	Mar	Apr	May	Jun	Jul	Aug	Sep	Oct	Nov	Dec	Year
Record high °C (°F)	36.6 (97.9)	39.4 (102.9)	43.6 (110.5)	45.6 (114.1)	46.2 (115.2)	45.6 (114.1)	39.1 (102.4)	38.6 (101.5)	40.1 (104.2)	42.1 (107.8)	38.2 (100.8)	36.6 (97.9)	46.2 (115.2)
Mean daily maximum °C (°F)	29.6 (85.3)	32.4 (90.3)	36.8 (98.2)	40.4 (104.7)	41.0 (105.8)	37.3 (99.1)	32.7 (90.9)	31.4 (88.5)	32.9 (91.2)	35.3 (95.5)	33.7 (92.7)	30.8 (87.4)	34.5 (94.1)
Mean daily minimum °C (°F)	11.7 (53.1)	14.7 (58.5)	19.1 (66.4)	23.2 (73.8)	25.8 (78.4)	26.5 (79.7)	25.3 (77.5)	24.4 (75.9)	23.5 (74.3)	21.5 (70.7)	17.2 (63.0)	13.1 (55.6)	20.6 (69.1)
Record low °C (°F)	1.6 (34.9)	3.5 (38.3)	9.1 (48.4)	14.1 (57.4)	18.0 (64.4)	20.6 (69.1)	21.4 (70.5)	21.1 (70.0)	18.1 (64.6)	14.4 (57.9)	9.1 (48.4)	4.1 (39.4)	1.6 (34.9)
Average rainfall mm (inches)	0.0 (0.0)	0.0 (0.0)	1.3 (0.05)	4.6 (0.18)	3.2 (0.13)	112.8 (4.44)	213.3 (8.40)	139.9 (5.51)	109.5 (4.31)	25.1 (0.99)	4.9 (0.19)	0.3 (0.01)	615.0 (24.21)
Average rainy days	0.0	0.0	0.1	0.2	0.5	5.2	9.0	7.1	5.5	1.2	0.4	0.0	29.2
Average relative humidity (%) (at 17:30 IST)	28	22	19	19	29	54	69	72	64	42	33	30	40
Source: India Meteorological Department

== Demographics ==
As of 2001 India census, Amreli had a population of 90,243. Males constitute 52% of the population and females 48%. Amreli has an average literacy rate of 78%, higher than the national average of 59.5%; with 55% of the males and 45% of females literate. 10% of the population is under 6 years of age.

- Area – 6,760 km^{2}.
- District Population – 15,14,000
- City Population – 2,75,000
- Male Literacy – 81.82%
- Female Literacy – 66.97%
- Headquarters – Amreli
- Talukas – 11
- Villages – 595

== Villages ==
- Ghandla
- Dhargani
- Jalia
- Shedubhar
- Virpur (gadhiya)
- Shekh Pipariya (Bhadani)
- Lapaliya
- Babariyadhar
- Nana Bhamodra

• Mota bhandariya

== Notable people ==
- Bhoja Bhagat was a saint.
- Yogiji Maharaj – Sadhu Gnãnjivandas (23 May 1892 – 23 January 1971), commonly known as Yogiji Maharaj, was a Hindu sadhu and guru who is recognized as the fourth spiritual successor to Swaminarayan by the Bochasanwasi Shri Akshar Purushottam
- Jivraj Narayan Mehta is first chief minister of newly formed Gujarat state
- Ramesh Parekh, famous poet of Gujarat.
- Ramesh Oza, is a Hindu preacher famous for Bhagwat Kathakar from a small village Devka near Rajula of Amreli district
- Dilip Shanghvi, said to be 2nd richest person in India.
- Toofan Rafai - Artist and painter specially known for his dye colours.
- Savji Dhanji Dholakia, the Indian diamond merchant from Surat and the founder of Hari Krishna Exports Pvt. Ltd., hails from Dudhala village.
- Vasant Gajera, founder of Laxmi Diamond Group.
- K Lal, a magician born in Mavjinjava village, Amreli district.
- Dina Pathak is famous Bollywood actress & president of National Federation of Indian Women.
