= Naranbhai =

Naranbhai may refer to

- Naranbhai Kachhadia, Indian Politician
- Naranbhai Rathwa, Indian Politician
