= Hansa Mehta =

Indian activist, educator, and writer (1897–1995)

- Born: Hansa Manubhai Mehta; 3 July 1897; Surat, Bombay Presidency, British India
- Died: 4 April 1995 (aged 97)
- Spouse: Jivraj Narayan Mehta
- Parents: Manubhai Mehta (father); Harshadagauri Mehta (mother)
- Awards: Padma Bhushan 1959

Hansa Jivraj Mehta (née Manubhai Mehta; 3 July 1897 – 4 April 1995) was an Indian reformist, social activist, educator, independence activist, feminist and writer. She was one of only two women delegates working alongside Eleanor Roosevelt in the UN Human Rights Commission 1946-48 ensuring the wording "all human beings" instead of "all men" in the Universal Declaration of Human Rights.

== Early life ==
Hansa Manubhai Mehta was born on 3 July 1897 in Surat, now in Gujarat. She was the daughter of Manubhai Mehta, philosophy professor at Baroda College (now Maharaja Sayajirao University of Baroda) and later Dewan of Baroda State, and the granddaughter of Nandshankar Mehta, a headmaster of an English-language school, civil servant, and the author of the first Gujarati novel Karan Ghelo. Her mother was Harshadagauri Mehta.

Mehta studied at an all-girls high school at a time when, she estimated, only 2 percent of Indian women were literate. She graduated with Philosophy in 1918. She studied journalism and sociology in England. In 1918, she met Sarojini Naidu during her education in England. Naidu would act as a mentor and brought her to the 1920 International Woman Suffrage Alliance conference in Geneva. She met Mahatma Gandhi in 1922 while he was in jail in India. In 1923, Mehta came to the United States to visit institutions for higher education where she learned about women's education in America. In 1930, she encountered Gandhi again when he called for women to join the freedom movement.

She was married to Jivraj Narayan Mehta, an eminent physician and administrator who was the first Chief Minister of Gujarat and eventually the Indian high commissioner to the United Kingdom.

== Career ==
=== Politics, education and activism ===
Hansa Mehta organized the picketing of shops selling foreign clothes and liquor, and participated in other freedom movement activities in line with the advice of Gandhi. For this she was jailed three times. Later She established Desh Sevika Dal in 1930. She was even arrested and sent to jail by the British along with her husband in 1932. she was elected to Bombay Legislative Council.

After independence, she was among the 15 women who were part of the constituent assembly that drafted the Indian Constitution. She lobbied for civil code that would lead to gender equality, meant to eventually supersede religious laws. She was a member of the Advisory Committee and Sub Committee on Fundamental Rights. She advocated for equality and justice for women in India.

Mehta was elected to Bombay Schools Committee in 1926 and founded, and later became president of All India Women's Conference in 1945–46. In her presidential address at the All India Women's Conference convention held in Hyderabad, she proposed a Charter of Women's Rights, where she linked the struggle for Indian independence with the one for women's rights. As one of three women who drafted the charter, she included the affirmation that women have equal rights in areas such as access to education, suffrage, pay, and property. She also rejected special quotas, instead advocating for an even playing field between women and men. In 1946, the panel eventually became the U.N Commission on the Status of Women. She held different posts in India from 1945 to 1960 - the vice-chancellor of SNDT Women's University, member of All India Secondary Board of Education, president of Inter University Board of India and vice-chancellor of Maharaja Sayajirao University of Baroda, among others.

=== Global Contributions ===
Mehta represented India on the Nuclear Sub-Committee on the status of women in 1946. As the Indian delegate on the UN Human Rights Commission in 1947–48. Hansa Mehta played a key role in shaping the Universal Declaration of Human Rights by expanding its meaning and scope During the drafting process, one of the major debates concerned the text of Article 1, which initially used the phrase “All men.” Mehta was responsible for changing the language of the Universal Declaration of Human Rights from "all men are born free and equal" to "all human beings are born free and equal", highlighting the need for gender equality. While Roosevelt asserted that the use of the word "men" was “generally accepted to include all human beings,” Mehta insisted that the language should be changed. Mehta strongly argued for public participation in the work of the Commission. She also argued for an effective enforcement mechanism

Mehta later went on to become the vice chairman of the Human Rights Commission of the United Nations in 1950. She was also a member of the executive board of UNESCO.

From 1946 to 1948, Mehta served as the vice chancellor of the Shreemati Nathibai Damodar Thackersey Women’s University, and from 1949 to 1958 as the Vice-Chancellor of the Maharaja Sayajirao University of Baroda, making her the first woman to act in that role at an Indian co-educational university. The eminent Indian sociologist M N Srinivas was one of the many beneficiaries of her mentorship in his early as a faculty member of the M S University, Baroda. As Srinivas recalls, "Under her leadership, the MS University began to be recognized by the cognoscenti as an innovative centre of learning." Hansa Mehta was "an unusual person" who wanted "the Baroda University to be a centre of excellence and to be different from other Indian universities... She had selected young men and women from all over the country to staff the departments. She took a keen interest in the university's functioning and activities, and she had to intervene frequently to see that scholars could get on with their work and the administrative staff did not block their way. Several of the latter were men with small minds and could block any attempt at change but they all had a wholesome fear of Mrs Mehta." Srivinas himself was appointed as a professor at a very young age because "Hansa Mehta had taken the risk of appointing an unknown young man in preference to Professor Radhakamal Mukerjee.

The U.N. holds a discussion series in her name, the Dr. Hansa Mehta Dialogue. The first installement took place in 2021 and centered on women's economic empowerment following the COVID-19 pandemic. The series aims to raise global awareness and conversation about gender equality, women's, and human rights.

=== As a Member of the Constituent Assembly ===
Hansa Mehta was one of the most prominent members of the Constituent Assembly, described as 'a founding mother of the Indian republic.' At the time of her election to the Constituent Assembly, she was the president of the All India Women's Conference (AIWC). As the AIWC president, in December 1945, she had initiated and presided over the drafting of the Indian Women's Charter of Rights and Duties that was collectively prepared by Kitty Shiva Rao, Renuka Ray, Kamaladevi Chattopadhyay, and Hannah Sen. When she was elected the Vice-President of the International Alliance of Women in August 1946, she had presented the Charter at its Interlaken Congress. She had also presented the Charter to several other bodies including the Cabinet Mission, and the UN Sub-Commission on the Status of Women. Leaders of the feminist campaign for election to the Constituent Assembly, wanted Hansa Mehta to be elected because the Constitution would design the fundamental rights of the future. Eventually, she, along with Rajkumari Amrit Kaur were elected to the Fundamental Rights Sub-Committee of the Constituent Assembly of India and made some of the most significant interventions during its discussions. The notes of dissent written by Hansa Mehta and Rajkumari Amrit Kaur include their objection to compulsory military service, the freedom of practice of religion, and the demand to make the Directive Principles of State Policy fundamental to the country's governance. These notes are considered as an expression of "women's determined refusal to be appropriated by the dominant discourses of the Constituent Assembly."

Hansa Mehta participated in the Constituent Assembly's discussions on the Hindu Code Bill during its legislative sessions. While criticizing the provisions for adoption in the proposed Bill, she reminded the Constituent Assembly that "We are a secular State. We want to be a secular State. Adoption in Hindu law is for religious purposes. Why should a secular State have anything to do with a religious custom?"

== Contribution to Literature ==
Hansa Mehta was a dedicated reader of classical Indian literature. As the Vice Chancellor of the MS University Baroda, Hansa Mehta had also taken a keen interest in the preparation and publication of the Critical Edition of the Ramayana on the pattern of the Critical Edition of the Mahabharata edited by the Bhandarkar Oriental Research Institute, Pune. She presided over the opening of the Ramayana Department at the Oriental Institute of the University in 1951. In 1954, she inaugurated the collation section for the Ramayana at the institute. Subsequently, when the first edition of the Critical Edition of The Valmiki Ramayana was published in 1961, it was dedicated to her. Besides the Ramayana, she ensured that MS University Baroda undertook projects to publish other monumental works of classical India.

Mehta wrote several children's books in Gujarati, including Arunnu Adbhut Swapna (1934), Bablana Parakramo (1929), Balvartavali Part 1-2 (1926, 1929). She translated some books of Valmiki Ramayana: Aranyakanda, Balakanda and Sundarakanda. She translated many English stories, including Gulliver's Travels. She had also adapted some plays of Shakespeare. Her essays were collected and published as Ketlak Lekho (1978).

== Awards ==
Hansa Mehta was awarded the Padma Bhushan in 1959.

== See also ==
- List of Gujarati-language writers
