= Janak Talaviya =

Indian politician

Janakbhai Talaviya (born 1979) is an Indian politician from Gujarat. He is a member of the Gujarat Legislative Assembly from Lathi Assembly constituency in Amreli district. He won the 2022 Gujarat Legislative Assembly election representing the Bharatiya Janata Party.

== Early life and education ==
Talaviya is from Lathi, Amreli district, Gujarat. He is the son of Punabhai Talaviya. He studied Class 12 at Mangiben Patel Secondary School, Surat and passed the examinations conducted by Gujarat Secondary Education Board in 1998. Later, he discontinued his studies. He owns Muralidhar cotton industries.

== Career ==
Talaviya won from Lathi Assembly constituency representing the Bharatiya Janata Party in the 2022 Gujarat Legislative Assembly election. He polled 64,866 votes and defeated his nearest rival, Virjibhai Thummar of the Indian National Congress, by a margin of 29,274 votes.
