= Madhavav =

- Interactive map of the Madhavav area

General information
- Architectural style: Indian architecture
- Location: Wadhwan, India
- Coordinates: 22.709364°N 71.674411°E
- Completed: 1294

Technical details
- Floor count: Six storied stepwell

Design and construction
- Architect: Local
- Designations: ASI State Protected Monument No. S-GJ-226

Madhavav or Madhav Vav is a stepwell located in Wadhwan town of Surendranagar district, Gujarat, India. It is located in the western side of old town.

== History ==
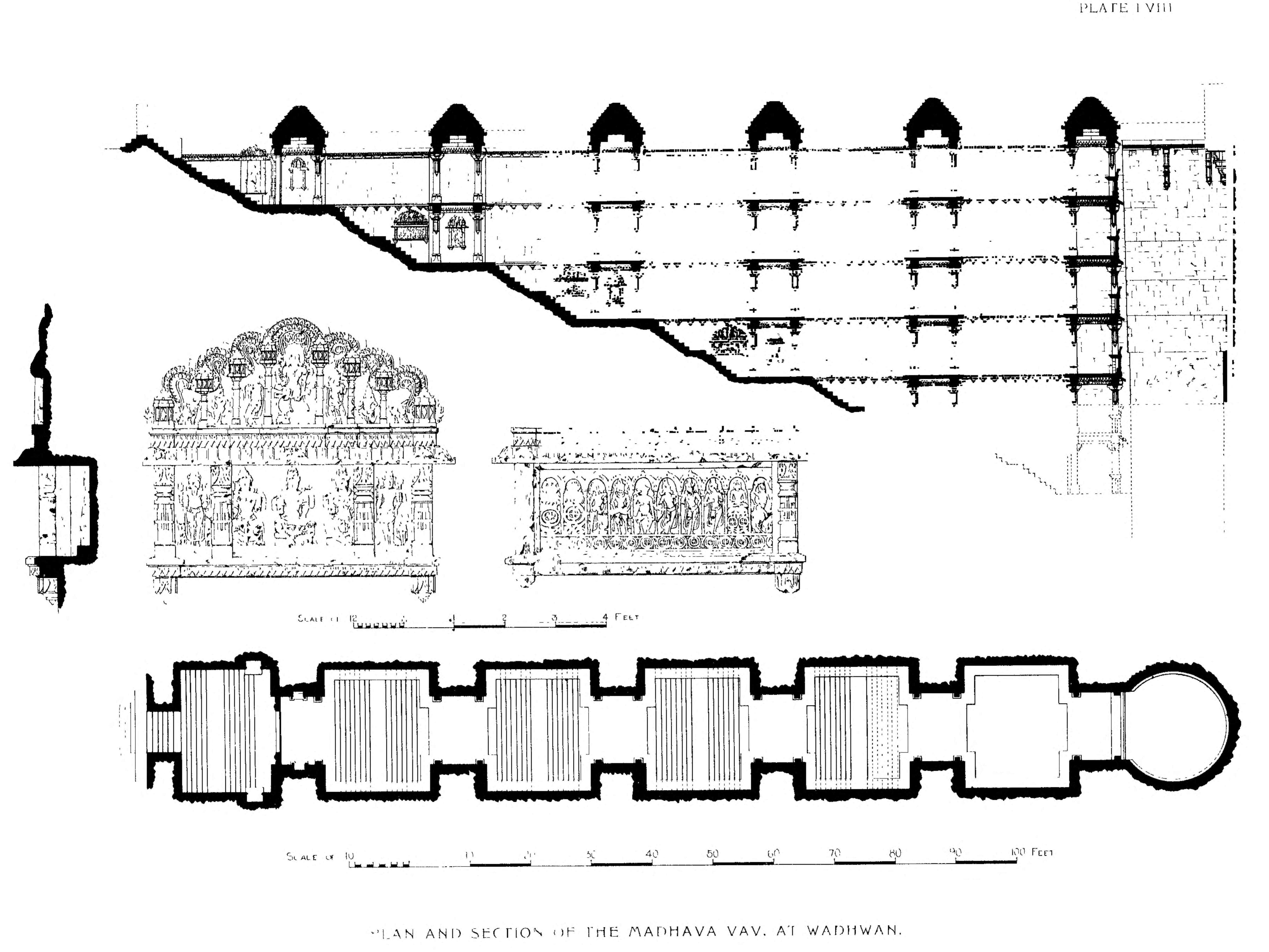
Plan and section of Madhavav

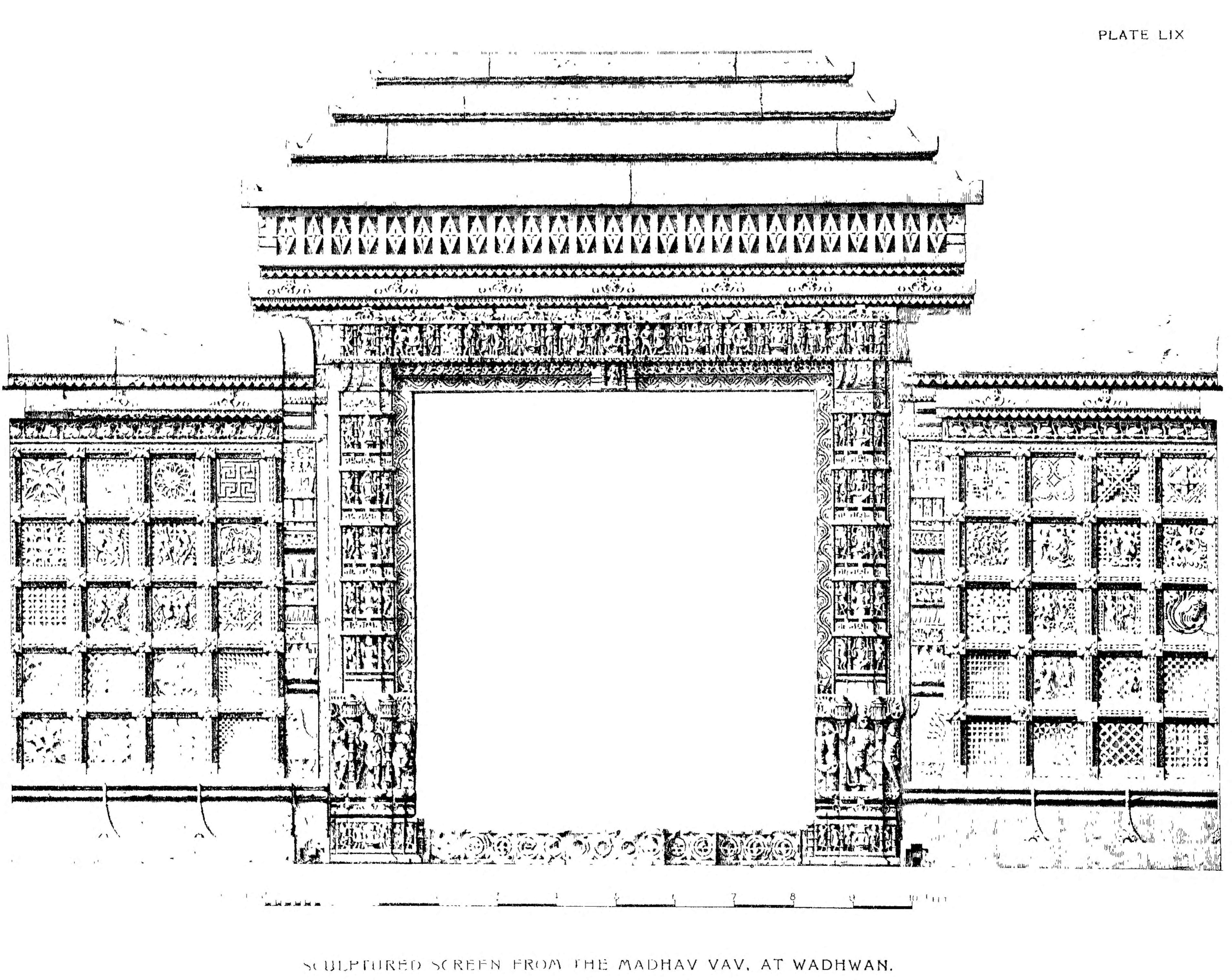
sculptured screens from Madhavav

There are two inscriptions in the stepwell. The Sanskrit inscription states that it was built by Madhav and Keshav, the Nagar Brahmin minister brothers in the court of Karandev II of Vaghela dynasty in 1294 (Vikram Samvat 1350) in honour of his parents. The second inscription, which is much eroded, tells about Lashamidevi (Lakshamidevi), daughter of Nagar Brahmin minister Sodhal; and Sindhu, son of Soma who were probably the parents of Madhav. The stepwell is now state protected monument but is not maintained well.

== Legends ==
According to legend, the stepwell was dry for twelve years after its construction. The royal astrologer predicted the need of sacrifice by an ideal couple for water in the stepwell. The prince and her wife agreed for welfare of people even though they had an infant. They descended the stepwell in bridal clothes. As they reached the seventh step, the stepwell filled with water and they drowned. They sacrifice ensured water in the stepwell.

The legend is popular folklore and is celebrated in folk-songs. It is also believed locally that a ghost haunts the stepwell and demands death of a person by drowning every three years.

== Architecture ==
The stepwell is constructed in east-west direction; the entrance is in the west while the well is in the east. It is 55 metres long and the stepped corridor are 49.80 metres long. It is entered by small narrow staircase. It has six kuta (pavilion towers) and six flights of steps to descend. The breadth decrease at each pavilion; 6 metres at the flight of steps to 3.6 metres at the pavilion. Each pavilion formed by four pilasters is 2.7 metres long. Due to height of 4.80 metre between two pavilion, the thick wall is necessary. There are slightly convex roofs on each kuta in ogee moulding formed by nine horizontal tiers. The roofs are crowned by small finials in form of kalasha.

The well is 5.3 metres in diameter. At the top of the round well-shaft, there are six double-bent struts in the last storey; four in back wall covered with stone lintel for drawing up water, in leathern bags for irrigation purposes.

There are stone screens on each side of first kuta forming its walls. Each screen has 16 squares, four in each of four rows. The pattern of these screens are identical to Vimal Vasahi temple of Dilwara Temples on Mount Abu and Queens' Mosque, Sarangpur, Ahmedabad. The door-frame has small sculptures of seated gods in compartments of vertical parts of frame and scenes of daily life in horizontal lintel.

In the walls, upon either side, at intervals in the descend, are sculptured niches holding groups of images which are very much mutilated. It includes sculptures of Bhairava, Saptamatrika, Navagraha, Dashavatara and other gods and goddesses which are difficult to recognise due to its condition. There is sculptures of couple in one niche which is recognised as that of Madhav and his wife. There is a short inscription under it. It also has some erotic sculptures.

== In popular culture ==
The legend was depicted in Gujarati film Vanzari Vav (1977). Dehuna Daan Arthat Madhavav, a play was created based on the legend. The folk-song of Madhavav is collected in Radhiyali Ratna Raas by Jhaverchand Meghani. Lalit Trivedi published a poem on the legend in his poetry collection, Andar Bahar Ekakar.
