= Jivraj Narayan Mehta =

1st Chief Minister of Gujarat

Dr. Jivraj Mehta
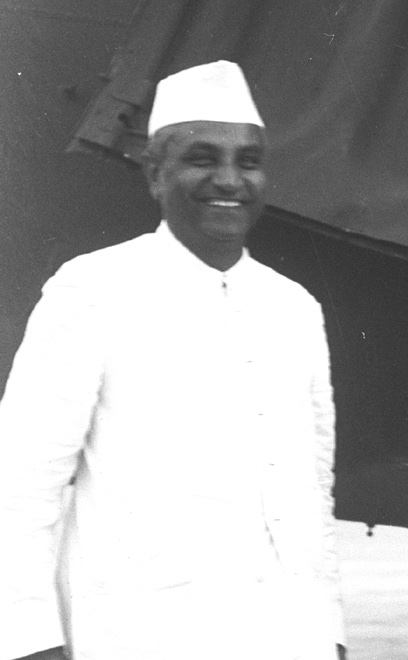
- Mehta in October 1947

1st Chief Minister of Gujarat
- In office 1 May 1960 – 25 February 1963
- Governor: Mehdi Nawaz Jung
- Preceded by: Yashwantrao Chavan as Bombay State; Office Established
- Succeeded by: Balwantrai Mehta

Member of Parliament, Lok Sabha
- In office 1971-1977
- Preceded by: Jayaben Shah
- Succeeded by: Dwarkadas Patel
- Constituency: Amreli, Gujarat

Personal details
- Born: 29 August 1887 Amreli, Bombay Presidency, British India
- Died: 7 November 1978 (aged 91) Bombay, Maharashtra, India
- Party: Indian National Congress
- Spouse: Hansa Jivraj Mehta

Jivraj Narayan Mehta (29 August 1887 – 7 November 1978) was an Indian politician and the first Chief Minister of Gujarat. He also served as the first "Dewan" (Prime Minister) of the erstwhile Baroda state, and Indian high commissioner to the United Kingdom from 1963 to 1966.

== Early life ==
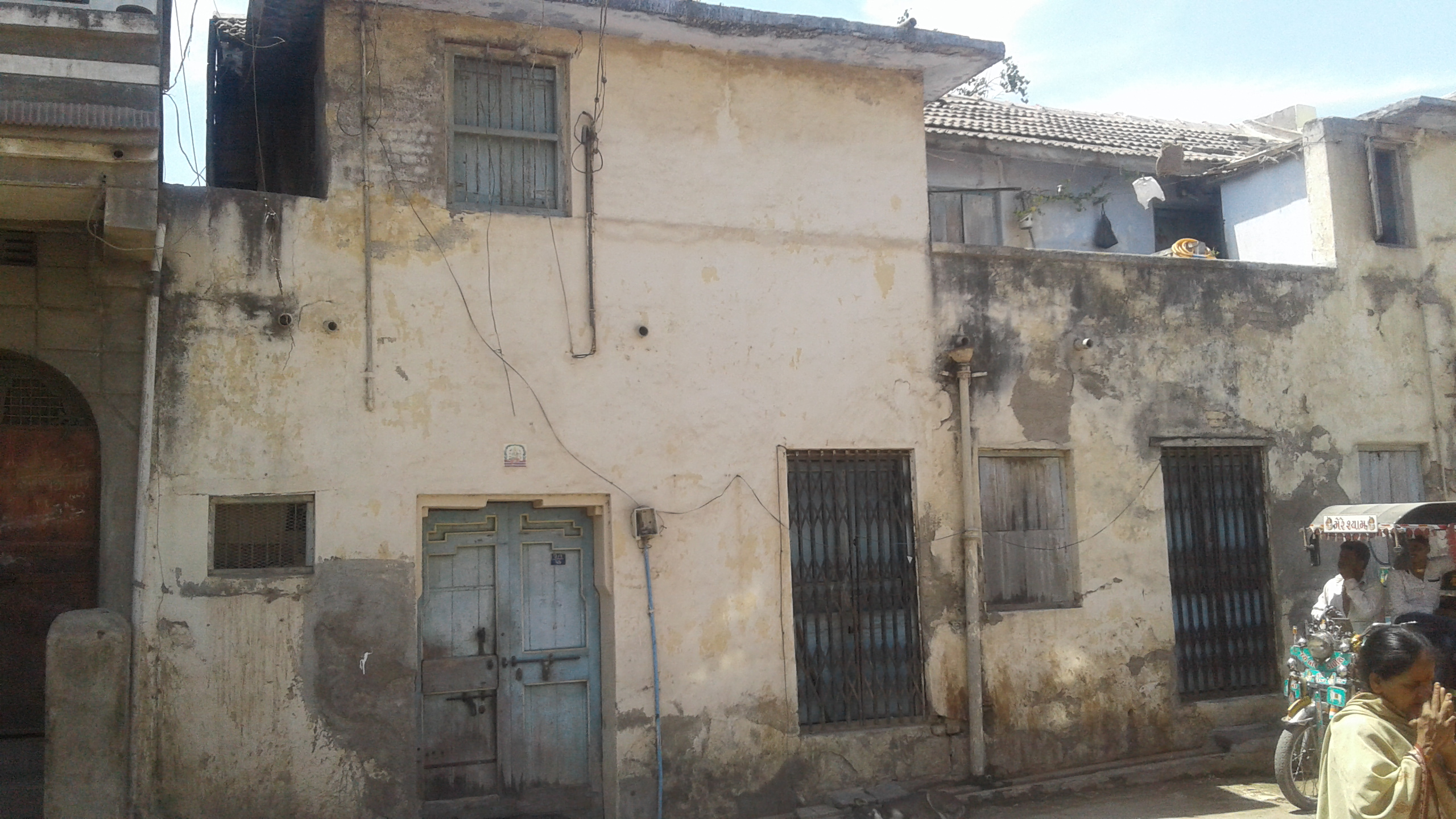
Jivraj Mehta's house in Amreli

Jivraj Narayan Mehta was born on 29 August 1887 to Narayan and Jamakben Mehta in a Kapol Bania caste Amreli in Bombay Presidency. He was son-in-law of Manubhai Mehta, then Dewan of Baroda state. In his early age, Dr. Eduljee Rustomji Dadachandjee, a civil surgeon in Amreli prompted him to take up medicine. He subsequently secured admission into the Grant Medical College and Sir J. J. Hospital, Bombay, after clearing a stiff written test and a thorough viva voce examination that was conducted by the British IMS officers.

Mehta's medical education was sponsored by the Seth VM Kapol Boarding Trust. He topped the class in his first Licentiate in Medicine and Surgery (equivalent of MBBS) examination. In his final year, he won seven of the eight prizes open to his batch and shared the eighth prize with his hostel roommate Kashinath Dikshit.

Later, for postgraduate studies in London he applied to the Tata education foundation for a student loan and he was selected as one of the only two students for this prestigious fellowship from amongst several bright students who had applied for it. Jivraj Mehta lived from 1909 to 1915 in London. He was the president of the Indian Students Association in London where he studied medicine and did his FRCS there. He won university gold medal in his MD examinations in 1914. Later, he became a member of the Royal College of Physicians of London.

== Political career ==
=== Doctor of Mahatma Gandhi ===
Mehta was briefly the personal doctor to Mahatma Gandhi after returning to India and joined the independence movement.

Mehta was twice incarcerated (1938 and 1942) by the British government for his role in Gandhi's Satyagraha movement. After independence in 1947, he held various public offices. He served as the first "Dewan" (Prime Minister) of the erstwhile Baroda state in free India sworn in on 4 September 1948, director general of health services and secretary to the ministry of health in the central government during the partition period, minister of public works, finance, industry and prohibition for the then Bombay state.

=== Chief minister ===
Mehta was the first chief minister of the newly formed Gujarat state from April 1960 to September 1963. Later he also served as the Indian high commissioner to the United Kingdom from 1963 to 1966.

== Contributions to medical education in India ==
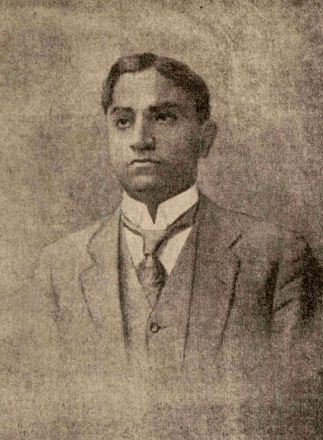
c. 1916

Mehta was the founder of Seth Gordhandas Sunderdas Medical College and King Edward VII Memorial Hospital, Mumbai. He served in these institutions as their first dean over a period of 17 years (1925–1942).

In the 1930s, Mehta had gauged the fundamental importance of research in medical education. As the dean, he made many efforts towards securing adequate funds for the institute. Drs. P. C. Bharucha, M. D. D. Gilder, N. A. Purandare and R. N. Cooper responded overwhelmingly to his appeal for financial donations to the college research corpus. However, similar requests to the Indian Research Fund Association went for nothing. Then Dr. Jivraj persuaded Sir Walter Morley Fletcher to visit KEM Hospital on his visit to Bombay to attend a dinner. He showed him the commendable research going on and also impressed upon Sir Walter the acute need of government support for such a research program. The result was government sanction of funds within a few weeks for the same projects through the Indian Research Fund Association.

Mehta with other medical personalities like Nilratan Sarkar and Dr. B. C. Roy strongly forwarded the case of the metropolitan city of Delhi, when the government was contemplating establishment of a central medical research institute at Dehradun. Their proposal was accepted by the government and result was All India Institute of Medical Sciences (AIIMS) at Delhi. He was also involved in the planning of the medical colleges and hospitals at Poona (now Pune), Ahmedabad, Nagpur and Aurangabad. In the establishment of the Topiwala Nair Municipal Hospital, Lokmanya Tilak Municipal Hospital and the Dr. Balabhai Nanavati Hospital in Mumbai, he played a key role. He was thrice elected president of the All India Medical Congress and also president of the Indian Medical Association.

Mehta died on 7 November 1978, at the age of 91. His marriage to Hansabhan in the 1920s provoked what historian John R. Wood describes as a "mild sensation" because it was an inter-caste union, with Mehta being of the Kapol Bania community and his wife coming from a prominent Nagar Brahmin family.

The newly instituted first-ever Dr. Jivraj Mehta Awards were also presented to veterans Dr. G. S. Sainani (Mumbai), Dr. V. Mohan (Chennai), Dr. Sidharth Shah (Mumbai), Dr. Ashok K. Das (Pondicherry) and Dr. S. K. Sharma (AIIMS, New Delhi) on 4 February 2015.
