= Jayaben =

Jayaben is an Indian name. It may refer to:

- Jayaben Desai (1933-2010), Indian-born UK trade unionist
- Jayaben Shah (1922-2014), Indian politician
- Jayaben Thakkar (born 1952), Indian politician
