= Lathi Assembly constituency =

Legislative Assembly constituency in Gujarat State, India

Coordinates: 21.73°N 71.39°E

Lathi
- Constituency No. 96 for the Gujarat Legislative Assembly

Constituency details
- Country: India
- Region: Western India
- State: Gujarat
- District: Amreli
- Lok Sabha constituency: Amreli
- Established: 1972
- Total electors: 223,713
- Reservation: None

Member of Legislative Assembly
- 15th Gujarat Legislative Assembly
- Incumbent Janak Talaviya
- Party: Bharatiya Janata Party
- Elected year: 2022

Lathi is one of the 182 Legislative Assembly constituencies of Gujarat state in India. It is part of Amreli district.

== List of segments ==
This assembly seat represents the following segments,

1. Lathi Taluka
2. Babra Taluka
3. Lilia Taluka (Part) Villages – Kankot Nana, Rajkot Nana

== Members of Legislative Assembly ==
Year	Member	Picture	Party
2007	Hanubhai Dhorajiya		Bharatiya Janata Party
2012	Bavkubhai Undhad		Indian National Congress
2014*	Bavkubhai Undhad		Bharatiya Janata Party
2017	Virjibhai Thummar		Indian National Congress
2022	Janakbhai Talaviya		Bharatiya Janata Party

*By election

== Election results ==
=== 2022 ===
Gujarat Assembly election, 2022:Lathi Assembly constituency
Party	Candidate	Votes	%	±%
BJP	Janak Talaviya	64,866	49.12	
INC	Virjibhai Thummar	35592	26.95	
AAP	Jayshukhbhai Ravajibhai Detroja (Doli)	26643	20.17	
RRP	J.R Parmar	402	0.3	N/A
NOTA	None of the Above	2040	1.54	
Majority		29,274	22.17	
Turnout				
Registered electors		221,063		
BJP gain from INC		Swing		

=== 2017 ===
Gujarat Legislative Assembly Election, 2017: Lathi
Party	Candidate	Votes	%	±%
INC	Virjibhai Thummar	64,743	49.94	
Bhartiya Janta Party	Gopalbhai Vastarpara	55,400	42.73	
Majority		9,343	7.21	
Turnout				

=== 2014 ===
Gujarat Assembly By election, 2014
Party	Candidate	Votes	%	±%
BJP	Bavkubhai Undhad	59,722	46.67	+11.44
INC	Hanubha	57,096	44.62	+7.38
Majority		2,626	2.05	−0.07
Turnout		127,960	65.06	−2.12
BJP gain from INC		Swing		

=== 2012 ===
Gujarat Assembly Election, 2007
Party	Candidate	Votes	%	±%
INC	Bavkubhai Undhad	48793	37.34	
BJP	Valajibhai Khokhariya	46029	35.23	
Majority		2764	2.12	
Turnout		130661	67.19	
INC gain from BJP		Swing		

== See also ==
- List of constituencies of Gujarat Legislative Assembly
- Gujarat Legislative Assembly
