= Vaghel =

Coordinates: 23.6373883°N 71.9143152°E

Vaghel is a village in Harij Taluka of Patan district in Gujarat, India.

== History ==
Vaghel, historically known as Vyaghrapalli, was the chief place in a grant of land made by Chaulukya king Kumarapala (1143- 1174) to his cousin Anak the grandfather of Virdhaval, who about 1243 founded the Vaghela dynasty (1243 - 1304).

It was under Palanpur Agency of Bombay Presidency, which in 1925 became the Banas Kantha Agency. After Independence of India in 1947, Bombay Presidency was reorganized in Bombay State. When Gujarat state was formed in 1960 from Bombay State, it fell under Gujarat.

Vaghel historically Lake - Historical Bhutaval Lake 1100 Years Old, Historical Bandiyu Lake - Vaghel, Harij

== Places of interest ==
There is a small temple with a single open entrance hall, mandap, one story high, with pyramid roof, three porticoes, and a spire-surmounted shrine. There are also some very curious monumental stones, paliyas, with spirited deep cut carvings on all four sides and with tops cut in the form of a temple spire. They have much in common with the more ambitions cupolas, chhatris, and seem to come between them and the ordinary memorial stones.
