= Bharatbhai Sutariya =

Indian politician

Bharatbhai Manubhai Sutariya

Member of Parliament, Lok Sabha
- Incumbent
- Assumed office June 2024
- Preceded by: Naranbhai Kachhadia
- Constituency: Amreli

Personal details
- Born: 1 July 1969 (age 56) Jarakhiya, Amreli, Gujarat
- Party: Bharatiya Janta Party
- Spouse: Bhanuben
- Children: 1
- Parent(s): Manubhai, Savitaben

Bharatbhai Manubhai Sutariya is an Indian politician. He is a member of Bharatiya Janta Party and current MP of Amreli.

== Political career ==
Sutariya has been elected as a Member of Parliament from Amreli Lok Sabha constituency in 2024 Indian general elections. He defeated Jenny Thummar of Indian National Congress by a margin of 321068 votes.
