= Amreli Lok Sabha constituency =

Lok Sabha Constituency in Gujarat

Coordinates: 21.6°N 71.2°E

Amreli
- Lok Sabha constituency

Constituency details
- Country: India
- Region: Western India
- State: Gujarat
- Assembly constituencies: Dhari; Amreli; Babra-Lathi; Savarkundla; Rajula; Mahuva; Gariadhar
- Established: 1957
- Reservation: None

Member of Parliament
- 18th Lok Sabha
- Incumbent Bharatbhai Manubhai Sutariya
- Party: Bharatiya Janata Party
- Elected year: 2024

Amreli is one of the 26 Lok Sabha constituencies in Gujarat state, in western India.

== Assembly segments ==
Presently, Amreli Lok Sabha constituency comprises seven Vidhan Sabha (legislative assembly) segments. These are:

Constituency number	Name	Reserved for (SC/ST/None)	District	Party	2024 Lead
94	Dhari	None	Amreli	BJP	BJP
95	Amreli	None	Amreli	BJP	BJP
96	Lathi	None	Amreli	BJP	BJP
97	Savarkundla	None	Amreli	BJP	BJP
98	Rajula	None	Amreli	BJP	BJP
99	Mahuva	None	Bhavnagar	BJP	BJP
101	Gariadhar	None	Bhavnagar	AAP	BJP

== Members of Parliament ==
Year	Winner	Party
1952-1957: Constituency "Amreli" did not exist
1957	Jayaben Shah	Indian National Congress
1962	Jayaben Shah	Indian National Congress
1967	Jayaben Shah	Indian National Congress
1971	Jivraj Mehta	Indian National Congress
1977	Dwarkadas Patel	Indian National Congress
1980	Navinchandra Ravani	Indian National Congress
1984	Navinchandra Ravani	Indian National Congress
1989	Manubhai Kotadia	Janata Dal
1991	Dileep Sanghani	Bharatiya Janata Party
1996	Dileep Sanghani	Bharatiya Janata Party
1998	Dileep Sanghani	Bharatiya Janata Party
1999	Dileep Sanghani	Bharatiya Janata Party
2004	Virjibhai Thummar	Indian National Congress
2009	Naranbhai Kachhadia	Bharatiya Janata Party
2014	Naranbhai Kachhadia	Bharatiya Janata Party
2019	Naranbhai Kachhadia	Bharatiya Janata Party
2024	Bharatbhai Manubhai Sutariya	Bharatiya Janata Party

== Election results ==
=== 2024 ===
2024 Indian general elections: Amreli
Party	Candidate	Votes	%	±%
BJP	Bharatbhai Manubhai Sutariya	580,872	66.28	+8.0
INC	Jennyben Thummar	2,59,804	29.64	−6.0
NOTA	None of the Above	11,349	1.29	
Majority		3,21,068		
Turnout		8,77,094	50.60	
BJP hold		Swing		

=== 2019 ===
2019 Indian general elections: Amreli
Party	Candidate	Votes	%	±%
BJP	Naranbhai Kachhadia	529,035	58.19	
INC	Paresh Dhanani	3,27,604	36.03	
NOTA	None of the Above	17,567	1.93	
Majority		2,01,431	22.16	
Turnout		909,167	55.97	+1.50
BJP hold		Swing		

=== General election 2014 ===
2014 Indian general elections: Amreli
Party	Candidate	Votes	%	±%
BJP	Naranbhai Kachhadia	436,715	53.99	+6.78
INC	Virjibhai Thummar	280,483	34.68	−5.42
AAP	Vallabh Sukhadiya	15,520	1.92	+1.92
NOTA	None of the Above	19,143	2.37	−−−
Majority		156,232	19.32	+12.21
Turnout		8,09,615	54.47	+14.68
BJP hold		Swing		

=== General elections 2009 ===
2009 Indian general elections: Amreli
Party	Candidate	Votes	%	±%
BJP	Naranbhai Kachhadia	247,660	47.21%	
INC	Nilaben Thumar	210,334	40.10%	
MJP	Ramesh Gohil	7,994	1.52%	
Majority		37,326	7.11%	
Turnout		524,697	39.97	
BJP gain from INC		Swing		

=== General elections 2004 ===
2004 Indian general elections: Amreli
Party	Candidate	Votes	%	±%
INC	Virjibhai Thummar	220,649	46.38%	
BJP	Dileep Sanghani	218,619	45.96%	
Majority		2,030	0.43%	
Turnout		475,646	46.38%	
INC gain from BJP		Swing		

== See also ==
- Amreli district
- List of constituencies of the Lok Sabha
