= Vaghela dynasty =

Dynasty of medieval India (1244–1304)

Vaghela Dynasty Vāghēlā rājavanśa
- 1244–1304
- The Vaghelas and neighbouring South Asian polities, circa 1250 CE.
- Status: Dynasty
- Capital: Dhavalakka (modern Dholka)
- Common languages: Apabhramsa, Prakrit, Old Gujarati
- Religion: Jainism; Hinduism
- Government: Monarchy
  - 1244–1262: Visala-deva (first)
  - 1296–1304: Karna-deva (Karna II) (last)
- History
  - Usurping of the Chaulukya throne by Visaladeva: 1244
  - Alauddin Khalji's conquest of Gujarat: 1304
Preceded by	Succeeded by
Chaulukya dynasty	Gujarat under Delhi Sultanate
- Today part of: India

Find spots of the inscriptions issued during the Vaghela reign (map of India).

The Vaghela dynasty ruled the Kingdom of Gujarat in India in the 13th century CE, with their capital at Dholka. They were the last dynasty to rule Gujarat before the Muslim conquest of the region.

Early members of the Vaghela family served the Chaulukya dynasty in the 12th century CE, and claimed to be a branch of that dynasty. In the 13th century, during the reign of the weak Chaulukya king Bhima II, the Vaghela general Lavanaprasada and his son Viradhavala gained a large amount of power in the kingdom, although they continued to nominally acknowledge Chaulukya suzerainty. In the mid-1240s, Viradhavala's son Visaladeva usurped the throne, and his successors ruled Gujarat until Karna Vaghela was defeated by Nusrat Khan of the Delhi Sultanate in 1304 CE, and lost Gujarat.

== Origin ==
The Vaghelas usurped power from the Chaulukya dynasty. According to the 14th century chronicler Merutunga, the earliest known member of the Vaghela family – "Dhavala" – married the maternal aunt of the Chaulukya monarch Kumarapala. The Vaghela court poet Someshvara described the Vaghela family as a branch of the Chaulukya family.

The Vaghelas called themselves Chaulukyas, and claimed same mythological descent as the Chaulukyas. The Khambhat inscription of the first Vaghela monarch Visaladeva gives the following account of the myth: Once Brahma was thinking who will destroy the sons of Diti (that is, the Daityas or demons). Suddenly, a warrior sprang from Brahma's chuluka. This hero, named Chaulukya, gave rise to the Chaulukya lineage, in which Arnoraja Vaghela was born.

The dynasty's name "Vyaghrapalliya" and its shortened form "Vaghela" come from the name of a village called Vyaghrapalli (literally "tiger's lair").

== Early members ==
=== Arnoraja ===
Arnoraja, who was a son of Dhavala and Kumarapala's maternal aunt, was the first member of the Vaghela family to gain importance. He seems to have participated in a military campaign in Saurashtra while serving Kumarapala. The Muralidhar temple inscription, discovered in the Desan village of Bhiloda taluka, credits him with conquering Saurashtra. According to the 13th century writer Udayaprabha Suri, Kumarapala granted the Bhimapalli village to Arnoraja for his services. It is possible that Arnoraja received the village for his role in the Saurashtra campaign of Kumarapala. He probably served as a sub-commander in this campaign, although the Vahgela records later magnified his role. According to historian A. K. Majumdar, the Bhimapalli village might have been same as the Vyaghrapalli village from which the dynasty's name is derived.

Arnoraja became prominent during the reign of Kumarapala's descendant Bhima II. Taking advantage of Bhima's young age, the provincial governors revolted against him. Arnoraja remained loyal to the king, and appears to have defeated the rebels, including the vassal rulers of Medapata and Chandravati. Bhima had other loyal officers such as Pratapamalla and Jagaddeva, but the Vaghela records give the entire credit for suppressing the revolt to Arnoraja.

=== Lavanaprasada ===
Lavanaprasada (alias Lavanyaprasada) was the son of Arnoraja and Salakhanadevi. According to a legend mentioned by Merutunga, Lavanaprasada was born when Arnoraja was a samanta (feudal lord) in Kumarapala's service. When Kumarapala heard about the news of the child's birth in his court, he declared that Arnoraja's son will have a brilliant future. As a feudatory of Bhima, Lavanaprasada held the ranks of Maha-mandaleshvara and Ranaka. His fief was Dhavalakakka (or Dholka). The later Dabhoi inscription describes him as the king of Gurjara country.

=== Viradhavala ===
Viradhavala was the son of Lavanaprasada and Madanarajni. According to Merutunga's account, Madanarajni left Lavanprasada and started living with Devaraja, who was the husband of her dead sister. Madanarajni took Viradhavala with him, but the boy returned to his father Lavanaprasada when he grew up and became ashamed of the situation.

During the reign of Bhima II, Lavanaprasada and Viradhavala repelled enemy invasions and saved the Chaulukya kingdom. Viradhavala probably died during the reign of Bhima, as his son Visaladeva had become the Mahamandaleshvara Ranaka by 1239 CE.

=== Virama ===
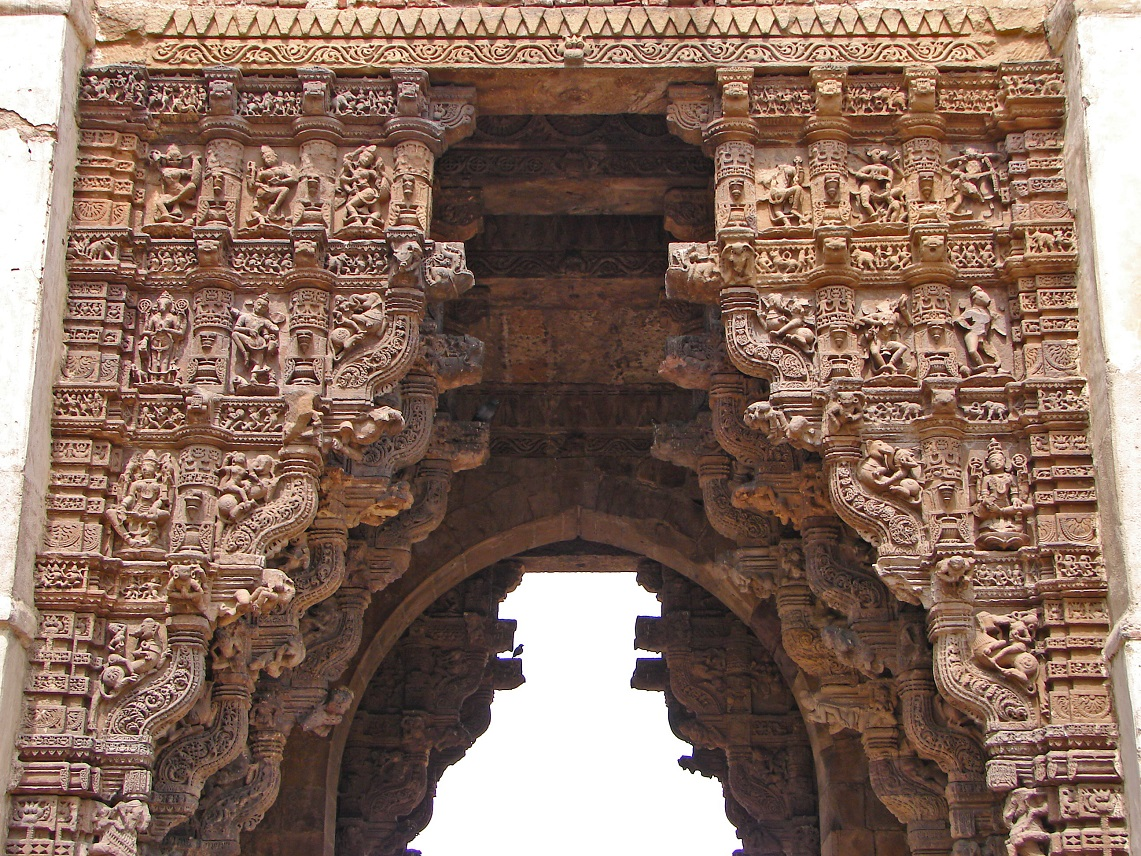
Detailed view of Vadodara Gate of Dabhoi fort

Visaladeva's succession was contested by a man named Virama. According to the colophon of a 1239 CE (1296 VS) manuscript, Virama held the title Mahamandeshvara Ranaka as a subordinate of Bhima II. The capital of his principality was located at Vidyutapura.

According to the medieval chronicler Rajashekhara Suri, Virama was the younger brother of Visaladeva. Rajashekhara's account of Virama goes like this: Once, a bania (merchant) made a costlier gift to a Vaishnava shrine than Virama did. This annoyed Virama, who tortured the bania. As a punishment, Viradhavala banished Virama to a place named Viramagrama. After Viradhavala's death, the minister Vastupala helped Visaladeva succeed his father. Virama tried to contest this succession, but was unsuccessful. He retired to Javalipura (modern Jalore), where he sought shelter from his father-in-law Udayasimha. However, Vastupala pressured Udayasimha to have Virama murdered.

Rajashekhara's account of the dynasty contains many inaccuracies in general. Historical evidence indicates that Virama was actually a brother (or half-brother) of Viradhavala, and thus an uncle of Visaladeva. According to the Vaghela records, Visaladeva's brother was Pratapamalla. Historian A. K. Majumdar dismisses Rajashekhara's account of Virama's death. According to Majumdar's theory, Udayasimha challenged the Chaulukya suzerainty, and Virama fought with him as a loyal subordinate of Bhima II. Virama was probably killed in a battle with Udayasimha, and not on the orders of Vastupala, as claimed by Rajashekhara.

== History ==
=== As sovereigns ===
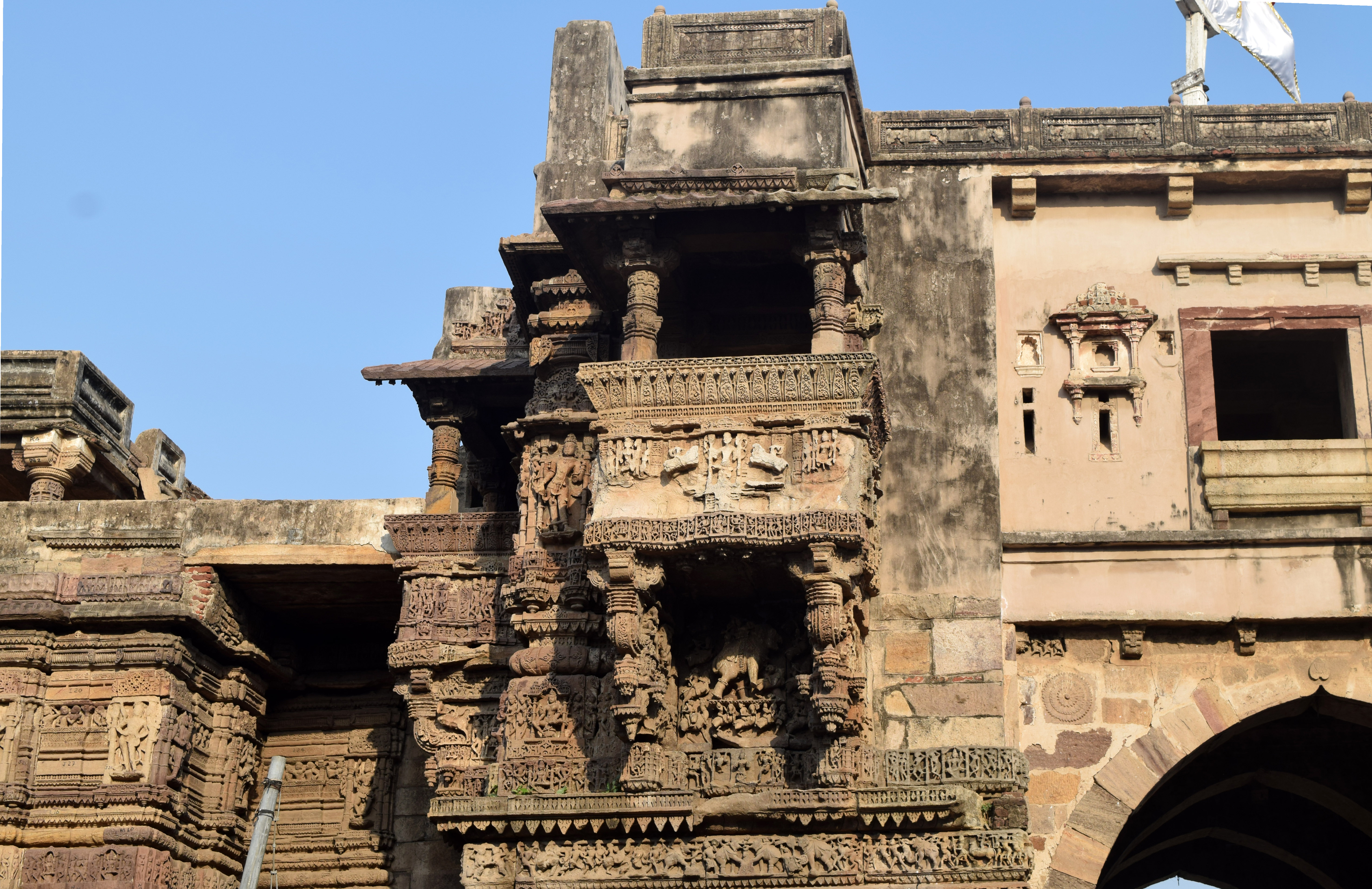
Balcony of Hira gate of Dabhoi fort

During the reign of Bhima II, the Vaghelas became the de facto rulers of the Chaulukya kingdom. Inscriptions at Girnar suggest that by 1231 CE (1288 VS), Lavanaprasada had assumed the title ‘’Maharajadhiraja’’ (“king of great kings”), and his son Viradhavala had assumed the title ‘’Maharaja’’ (“great king”). However, the Vaghelas continued to nominally acknowledge Bhima and his successor Tribhuvanapala as their overlords. Viradhavala’s son Visaladeva ascended the throne of Gujarat sometime around 1244 CE. How he usurped the power is uncertain: it is possible the last Chaulukya king Tribhuvanapala died heirless or was defeated by Visaladeva. Visaladeva invaded Malwa, which had been weakened because of invasions from the Delhi Sultanate. He met with little resistance in Malwa, and defeated the Paramara king Jaitugideva. Visaladeva also defeated a ruler of Mewar, possibly the Guhila king Tejasimha. He repulsed some invasions from south, by the Yadavas of Devagiri. However, later, he suffered setbacks against successive Yadava kings. Possibly as a move against the Yadavas, he forged a matrimonial alliance with the Hoysalas, who were the southern neighbours of the Yadavas. Visaladeva’s successor Arjunadeva ascended the throne around 1262 CE. Not much is known about the incidents of his reign, except that he suffered a defeat against the Yadavas. His elder son Rama succeeded him, and ruled for a few months. Subsequently, his younger son Sarangadeva ascended the throne. Sarangadeva defeated the Paramaras and the Yadavas. According to Vaghela records, sometime in or before 1285 CE, he repulsed an invasion by the Turushkas (Turkic people). Modern historians variously identify these Turushkas as Mongol raiders or Balban’s forces. Sarangadeva also sent an expedition against the Jethva chief Bhanu.

=== Decline ===
Around 1296 CE, Sarangadeva was succeeded by Rama’s son Karna. In 1299, the Delhi Sultan Alauddin Khalji sent an army to ransack Gujarat. According to multiple medieval chronicles, Karna had abducted the wife of his minister Madhava and killed Madhava’s brother. In revenge, Madhava instigated Alauddin to invade Gujarat.

In 1304, Karna lost his throne permanently after a second invasion from Delhi. According to Amir Khusrau's poem Ashiqa, the invasion resulted from a request by Karna’s former wife Kamala Devi, who had been captured by Alauddin’s forces during the first invasion. Eight years after being inducted into Alauddin’s harem, Kamala Devi requested Alauddin to get her daughter Devala Devi from Gujarat. Although Karna agreed to the demand, Alauddin ordered his army to invade Gujarat for a second time. ‘’Ashiqa’’ is not historically reliable, but some of the later medieval writers present its narrative as history. Other medieval chroniclers give different accounts of this incident, some of them mention no such request by Kamala Devi.

=== Descendants ===
No concrete information is available about any descendant of Karna II. A 1498 CE inscription shows that a family of the Vaghela clan was ruling at a place called Dandahi, as subordinates of the Muslim ruler Mahmud Begada. The rulers of the Rewa State also claimed descent from the Vaghelas through one Bhimadeva.

== Genealogy ==
A list of the known members of the Vaghela family is given below: all individuals are the sons of their predecessors, unless otherwise stated. The pre-sovereign members of the family include:

- Dhavala, married a sister of Kumarapala's mother
- Arnoraja, married Salakhanadevi
- Lavanaprasada, married Madanarajni
  - Viradhavala
    - Pratapamalla
    - Visaladeva
  - Virama

=== List of rulers ===
The sovereign Vaghela rulers include:

- Visala-deva (r. c. 1244 – c. 1262)
- Arjuna-deva (r. c. 1262 – c. 1275), son of Pratapamalla
- Rama (r. c. 1275), son of Arjunadeva
- Saranga-deva (r. c. 1275 – c. 1296), son of Arjunadeva
- Karna-deva (r. c. 1296 – c. 1304), son of Rama; also called Karna II to distinguish him from Karna Chaulukya

== Family Tree ==
Vaghela dynasty

Lavanaprasada
Visaladeva (1) r. 1244–1262	Pratapamalla r. 1262–1275
Arjunadeva (2) r. 1275
Rama (3) r. 1275	Sarangadeva (4) r. 1275-1296
Karna II (5) r.1296–1304

== Coinage ==
During Vaghela rule, the Gadhaiya coins increasingly lost its intrinsic value which was stayed unchanged for two centuries under Chaulukyas. The 4.4 g billon coin of Chaulukya had stable silver content of 2.02 g of which reduced to 1.83 g during Visala-deva's coins and its successive issues has less content, as low as 0.73 g. During stable net content of silver, the Gadhaiya coins were used in international trade from Afghanistan to Deccan. As its intrinsic value decreased, its circulation shrank to the area of modern Kheda district and its surroundings. These coins followed the tanka coins of Delhi. The coins of Visala-deva are mentioned as Visalamalla priya dra (dra stands for dramma) or Visala priya dra or Visalapri dra in various literary sources and epigraphs. The coins of Saranga-deva and Karna-deva had an elephant facing left on obverses and legends on the reverses. The legends reads shri saranga-de.. and Shri karna/devasya or Shri karna/devasa. Another coins of Karna-deva has Kumbha (vase) on its obverse enclosed in border made of dots and lines while reverse has the same legend. Another type of his coins of copper depicted lion facing left on obverse and the same legend on reverse.

== Cultural contributions ==
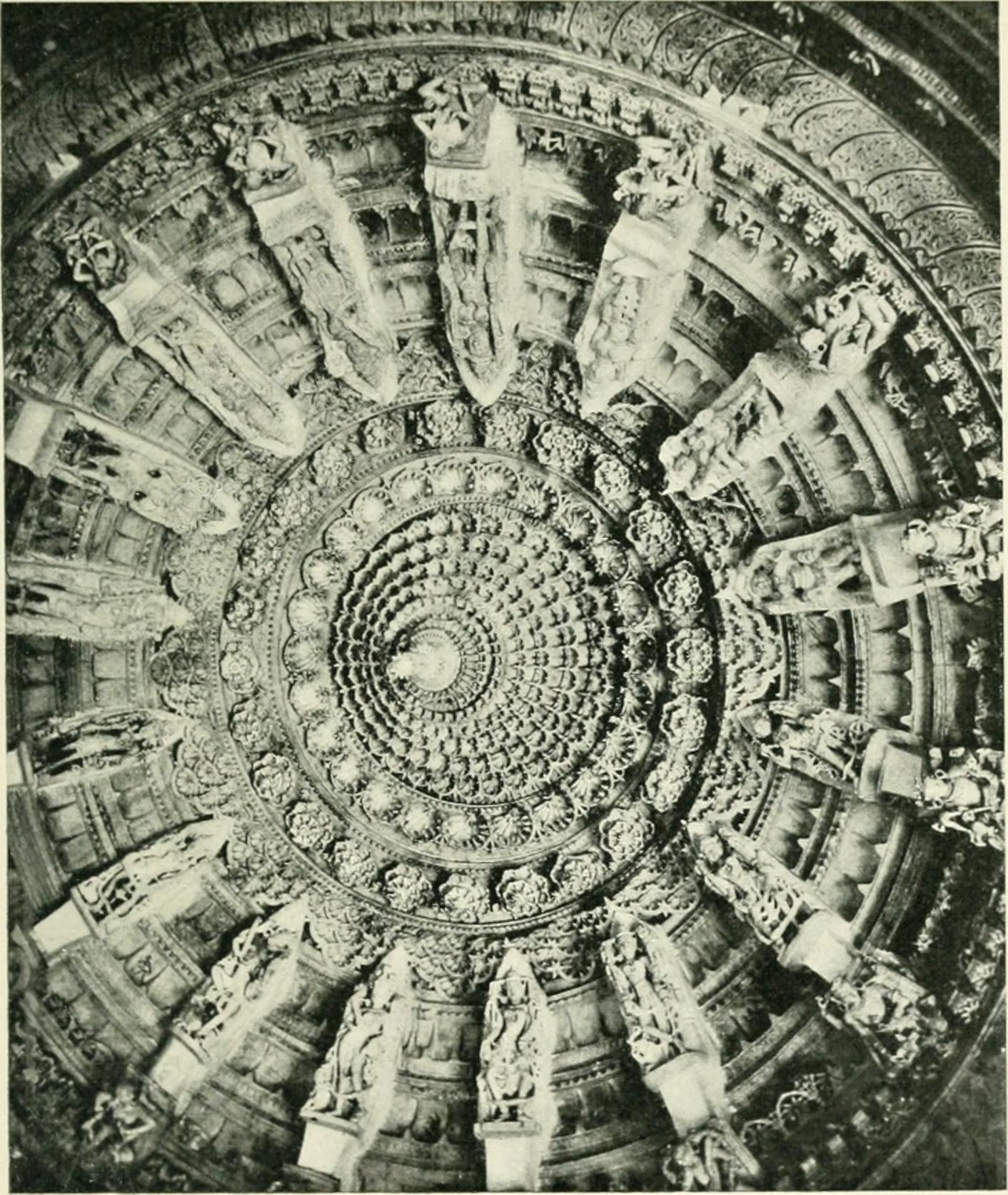
Ceiling of one of Dilwara Jain Temples

A number of temples were built during their reign by wealthy merchants and ministers, Vastupala and Tejapala who also served as ministers and generals, including one of Dilwara Temples at Mount Abu and Girnar Jain temples. In fact, ‘’Kirtikaumudi’’, the biography of Vastupala, written by Someshvara, a royal priest, is also an important source of the history of the dynasty. Visala-deva constructed or restored the fort of Dharbhavati (Dabhoi) which is well known for its elaborate carvings and gates. He built ’’pratolis’’, temples and ‘’vapis’’ in Darbhavati (Dabhoi) completed by about 1255 CE. Of its four gates, Hira Bhagol (with its adjacent temples) may have been built during Visaladeva’s reign while three other gates may have been built by Tejapala, as indicated in Jain ‘’prabandha’’s. The Satmukhi stepwell in Dabhoi is a temple built over a tank with seven wells ascribed to him. The Ra Khengar stepwell between Vanthali and Junagadh is stated to be constructed by Tejapala. The Madhavav in Wadhwan was built in 1294 AD (Vikram Samvat 1350) by Nagar Brahmin Madhav and Keshav, the ministers in court of the last Vaghela ruler Karna. The ‘’kunda’’ at Kapadvanj was built about this period. The Batris Kotha stepwell in Kapadvanj may have belonged to the 13th century due to its similarity with the Madha and Vikia stepwells.The Vaghela dynasty built a number of Jain temples, including marble temples at Mount Abu and temples at Mount Girnar, and also led large pilgrimages to Mount Shatrunjaya and Mount Girnar. Several Śvetāmbara Jain monks flourished during their rule, and the Vaghelas were likely followers of Jainism.

=== Temples ===
The building activities of Vastupala and Tejpala are mentioned in inscriptions as well as in works of contemporary writers. These works include Someshvara’s ‘’Kirtikaumudi’’, Jayasimhasuri’s ‘’Shakunika-vihara-prashasti’’, Udayaprabhasuri’s ‘’Dharmabhyudaya-mahakavya’’ and ‘’Sukrita-kirtikallolini’’, Arisimha’s ‘’Sukritasamkirtanam’’, Narendraprabhasuri’s prashashti, Vijayasenasuri’s ‘’Revantagiri-rasu’’ and Palhanaputra’s ‘’Abu-rasa’’. Later works include Merutunga’s ‘’Prabandha-Chintamani’’ (1309 CE), Jinaprabha’s ‘’Vividh-tirtha-kalpa’’ (early 14th century), Rajashekharasuri’s ‘’Prabandha-kosha’’ (1349 CE) and Jinaharshasuri’s ‘’Vastupala-charitam’’ (1441 CE).

==== Early Vaghela phase ====
More than fifty temples were built by Vastupala and Tejapala apart from large number of renovations and image installations. The ‘’Idramandapa’’ and six other temples were built by Vastupala on Shatrunjaya hill. He also built Vastupla-vihara and Parshwanatha temple on Girnar. He also built Adinatha temple at Dholka and Ashtapada-prasada at Prabhas. Tejapala built ‘’Asraja-vihara’’ at Anahilapataka and Junagadh for merit of his father. He also built Neminath Temple at Dholka and Adinath Temple at Prabhas. In memory of his mother Kumaradevi, he built temples at Khambhat and Dabhoi. He also built temples at Tharad, Karnavati, Godhra, Shatrunjaya, Girnar, Pavagadh, Navsari and several other places. His greatest temple is the Neminath Temple at Mount Abu. Of all these temples built by the brothers, only few survives such as Vastupala-vihara at Girnar (1231 CE), Neminath Temple at Abu and the temple at Prabhas. Other extant temples of this period is Sambhavanatha temple at Kumbhariya, Jain marble temple at Sarotra and Panch-Pandava Temple on Shatrunjaya.

==== Late Vaghela phase ====
The Vaghela princes had patronised the construction of temples and civic architecture. Lavanaprasada built Analeshwara and Salakshaneshwara temples for merit of his parents. His son Viramdeva had built Viramaeshwara temple. The temples of Rupanarayana and Balanarayana are mentioned in Kadi grant of 1261 CE. Jain merchant Jadagusha, as mentioned in his biography ‘’Jagaducharita’’ by Sarvanandasuri, built and renovated large number of Jain as well as Brahminical temples and civic constructions. His some notable constructions between 1250 and 1270 CE are Rishabha temple at Dhanka, a temple with 24 ‘’devkulika’’s at Wadhwan, a temple on Shatrunjaya hill and a temple with 52 ‘’devakulika’’ at Sevadi. ‘’Pethada-rasu’’ (1304 CE), Munisundarasuri’s ‘’Gurvavali’’ (c. 1459 CE), Ratnamandira Gani’s ‘’Upadeshatarangini’’ (c. 15th century) and Ratnamandana’s ‘’Sukritasagara’’ (c. 15th century) are important sources of life and works of Minister Pethada of Mandavagadh. He had built 84 Jain temples. His notable temples are at Shatrunjaya, Prabhasa, Dholka and Salakshanapura built around 1264 CE. Shravaka Jhalli built the temples of Parshwanatha and Jhalasara lake during this period. The extant temples of this phase include the Kalika temple and Vaidyanatha Temple at Dabhoi, the old shrine at Motab, the Jain temple and Nilkantha temple at Miyani and the Jain temple of Kanthkot in Kutch.

== Bibliography ==
- Aditya Behl (2012). Love's Subtle Magic: An Indian Islamic Literary Tradition, 1379–1545. Oxford University Press. ISBN 978-0-19-514670-7.
- Amol N. Bankar (2012). "History and Coinage of the Vaghelas: The Last Hindu Rulers of Gujarat". Journal of the Oriental Numismatic Society (212). London: 23–29. ISSN 1818-1252.
- Asoke Kumar Majumdar (1956). Chaulukyas of Gujarat. Bharatiya Vidya Bhavan. OCLC 4413150.
- H. G. Shastri (1989). A historical and cultural study of the inscriptions of Gujarat: from earliest times to the end of the Caulukya period (circa 1300 A.D.). B.J. Institute of Learning & Research. OCLC 916953474.
- Jutta Jain-Neubauer (1981). The Stepwells of Gujarat: In Art-historical Perspective. Abhinav. ISBN 9780391022843.
- Romila Thapar (2013). The Past Before Us. Harvard University Press. ISBN 978-0-674-72651-2.
- Someśvaradeva (1883). Kirtikaumudi: A Life of Vastupâla, a Minister, of Lavanaprasâda & Vîradhavala Vaghelâs. Government Central Book Department.
