= Naranbhai Kachhadia =

Indian politician

Member of Parliament, Lok Sabha
- Incumbent
- Assumed office 16 May 2009 - 2024
- Preceded by: Virjibhai Thummar
- Succeeded by: Bharatbhai Sutariya
- Constituency: Amreli

Personal details
- Born: 25 April 1955 (age 70) Amreli, Gujarat, India
- Party: Bharatiya Janata Party
- Spouse: Smt. Muktaben Kachhadiya
- Children: 3
- As of 10 March, 2013

Naranbhai Bhikhabhai Kachhadia (born 25 April 1955) is an Indian politician who is a member of the Lok Sabha, the lower house of the Parliament of India. He was elected to the Amreli constituency of Gujarat in 2009. He is a member of the Bharatiya Janata Party.
