= Karan Ghelo =

1866 Gujarati historical novel by Nandshankar Mehta

Karan Ghelo: Gujarat's Last Rajput King
- Book cover of English translation
- Author: Nandshankar Mehta
- Original title: કરણ ઘેલો: ગુજરાતનો છેલ્લો રજપૂત રાજા
- Translator: Tulsi Vatsal, Aban Mukherji
- Cover artist: Pia Hazarika
- Language: Gujarati
- Genre: Historical novel, classics
- Set in: Gujarat
- Published: 1866 (Gujarati); 2015 (English)
- Publisher: Gurjar Granthratna Karyalaya (Gujarati); Penguin Books India (English)
- Publication place: India
- Media type: Print and digital
- Pages: 344
- ISBN: 978-93-5214-011-4
- OCLC: 299885117
- Dewey Decimal: 891.473
- Original text: કરણ ઘેલો: ગુજરાતનો છેલ્લો રજપૂત રાજા at Gujarati Wikisource

Karan Ghelo: Gujarat's Last Rajput King (Gujarati: કરણ ઘેલો: ગુજરાતનો છેલ્લો રજપૂત રાજા) is a Gujarati historical novel by Nandshankar Mehta. It was published in 1866 and was the first original novel in Gujarati. (Note: In 1862, Parsi author Sorabshah Dadabhai Munsafa published Hindustan Madhyeñun Jhumpadu (Gujarati:હિન્દુસ્તાન મધ્યેનું ઝૂંપડું), a sixty nine page story as a novel. It was a Gujarati translation of The Indian Cottage or A Search After Truth (1791), an English translation by Edward Augustus Kendall of the French work La Chaumière Indienne (1790) by Jacques-Henri Bernardin de Saint-Pierre. As it was a translation of a translation, its claim as the first novel in Gujarati is disputed and Karan Ghelo is considered as the first original novel of Gujarati language. See Page 386, History of Indian Literature.) The book was translated in English in 2015.

The novel depicts Karan, the last Vaghela ruler of Gujarat (c. 1296–1305) who was defeated by the Turkish forces of Allauddin Khilji in 1298. The novel was written for educational purpose. It was based on variety of historical sources but author took liberty in depiction of some incidents. The novel deals with social as well as religious issues.

The book was well received and was translated in Marathi and English. It was adapted into plays and films.

== Plot ==
The Rajput king Karan Vaghela rules Anhilwad Patan, a large kingdom located in north Gujarat, and is well-served by his prime minister, Madhav. It happens one day that he comes face-to-face with Madhav's wife, Roopsundari (who, like all well-born women, lives in seclusion) and has a chat with her. The king becomes besotted by her and, after pondering for a long time, decides to set aside all considerations of decency and propriety in order to avail himself of the woman. He sends the minister away on a mission and, in his absence, abducts Roopsundari. Madhav's brother is killed by the king's men while making a heroic but vain attempt to protect his sister-in-law. Later the same day, his wife Gunasundari commits Sati by immolating herself on the funeral pyre of her valiant husband. The hapless Roopsundari, after being abducted and taken to the palace, kills herself before it is possible for the king to ruin her virtue. She dies with her chastity intact, and the king has gained nothing but infamy for his despicable deed.

He has also made a dangerous and relentless enemy. His former minister Madhav has escaped the devastation of his family. He abandons Anhilwad Patan for good and makes his way to Delhi. On his way, he experiences many adventures, including several wonderful ones at the almost mystical Mount Abu. Madhav eventually reaches Delhi, where he persuades the Muslim sultan Allauddin Khilji to invade Gujarat, promising him all help in the venture and much plunder at the end of it. As former minister, Madhav is a knowledgeable and influential man. With his help, Khilji invades Gujarat, destroys Patan fort and plunders the treasures of that kingdom and of several others. On his part, King Karan Vaghela performs many heroic feats on battlefield, but eventually loses not just his kingdom but also his wife, Kaularani.

After the defeat, Karan gathers what remains of his family and followers and flees to Baglan in south Gujarat, to seek refuge with his old friend Ramdev, the Maratha ruler of Deogadh. With him is his unwed daughter, Deval Devi, still only a child. As the dust settles and negotiations for peace are set afoot, Karan is required to face one more horror: the hateful Khilji wants Karan to give his daughter in marriage to his own son and heir, Khizr Khan. The proposal is abominable to Karan, and after he returns an insulting refusal, a second battle becomes inevitable. As he prepares for war, Karan is extremely concerned about the security of his daughter and the preservation of her virtue and her future. He therefore bestows his daughter upon Shankaldev, the son and heir of his host and old friend Ramdev. Their betrothal is performed shortly before the battle with Khilji commences. Nevertheless, that battle is lost, and the daughter is also lost with the battle. It is depicted in the book that Karan Vaghela dies a martyr on the field of battle and does not live to witness invasion of his motherland by invaders. His defeat results in the end of Rajput (Hindu) rule and the beginning of Muslim rule in Gujarat.

== Origin ==
Nandshankar Mehta was the headmaster of an English-medium school in Surat. The British administrators of Bombay Presidency were encouraging local Indians to write books for educational purpose.

Mehta had written in the preface to the first edition,

Most people of this [Gujarat] province are fond of reading stories set in poetic form, but only a very few examples of these stories are readily available in prose; and the available ones are not well known. In order to fulfil this lacuna and to recreate versions of English narratives and stories in Gujarati, the former Educational Inspector of this province, Mr Russell Sahib, urged me to write a story along these lines. On that basis, in approximately three years, I wrote the book.

He started writing in 1863 and completed the novel in 1866. According to his son and biographer Vinayak Mehta, he wanted to write a historical novel on the pivotal incident in the history of Gujarat. He had considered to write a novel on the fall of Champaner and the destruction of Somnath temple but finally decided to write about the conquest of Gujarat by Turkish forces of Allauddin Khilji in 1298. The conquest ended the Hindu Rajput rule in Gujarat and started the Muslim rule in the state. The defeat gained the epithet, Ghelo (foolish or crazy) to Karan Vaghela. He used western style of novel writing with local style of inclusion of stories within stories in narrative.

He was interested in the history and used several historical materials including indigenous histories, bard tales, Jain chronicles or Persian sources for the novel. The invasion by Khilji, the story of Madhav's revenge, the defeat of Karan Vaghela and the fall of Patan had been subjects of the oral traditions of bards, the Bhats of Gujarat. Many contemporary Jain chronicles such as the Prabandhachintamani of Merutunga (1305), Dharmaranya (written between 1300 and 1450), and Tirthakalpataru of Jinaprabha Suri gave accounts of the invasion. It is also recorded in Padmanabha's medieval epic, Kanhadade Prabandha, written in 1455.

Mehta had drawn the core story of Karan Vaghela as well several detailed description of the historical time from the Rasamala; a collection of bard tales, Persian texts, Jain chronicles, folklore of Gujarat; published by Alexander Kinloch Forbes with help of Dalpatram in 1858.

For scenes in Delhi, he had used Persian texts such as the works of Amir Khusrau, Khilji's court poet, and the accounts of Ziauddin Barni. Karan Vaghela's second battle with Khilji's forces and the capture of his daughter Devaldevi were described by Amir Khusrau in the masnavi Deval Devi Khizr Khan, popularly known as Ishqia. The 16th-century historian Ferishta had also written prose on the romance between Deval Devi and Khizr Khan.

== Themes ==
Nandshankar Mehta was a social and religious reformer so he had discussed several social and religious ideas throughout the novel. He had discussed issues of arranged marriage and child marriage in particularly through the love story of Devaldevi and Shankaldev. He had advocated marriage based on consent, commitment, hard work and mutual respect. Through the reunion between Madhav and Roopsundari, he had portrayed that "fallen women" are accepted. He had also put his arguments against Sati and Jauhar traditions by the immolation of Gunsundari, the wife of Madhav's brother.

== Historical accuracy ==
Mehta had written in the first edition,

My intention in writing the book was to draw as accurately as possible a picture of how things were at the time of the story – the manners of the men and women of the time and their way of thinking; the principles of government of the Rajput kings of Gujarat and the Muslim emperors of Delhi; the heroism and the pride of caste of the men and women of Rajasthan, and the passion and the religious fanaticism of the Muslims.

His use of several types of historical sources gives detailed and accurate account of the historical times as described in the sources. He has taken liberty to depict Karan Vaghela fighting heroically and being defeated though the sources describe that he fled.

The Persian sources describe the conquest of Gujarat as a mere campaign which succeeded without much efforts. Kanhadade Prabandha describes the destructive effect of invasion and blames Madhav. The Rajput sources blame Madhav and also consider it as divine retribution for not following the rules of Kshatriya. Mehta had described the invasion as the result of Karan Vaghela's own deeds.

== Release and reception ==
Nandshankar Mehta published Karan Ghelo in 1866. It was the first original novel in Gujarati. It was an immediate success. It was very popular and had nine reprints between 1866 and 1934. It was revived and reprinted in 1986 and last in 2007. It was the only novel written by Mehta.

Sisir Kumar Das notes that the story became very popular due to evocation of the glory of ancient town of Surat, the residence of Mehta. He also notes that the story has fine descriptive passages but it fails to qualify as fine narrative. He considers the novel as a foundation of the historical novel in Gujarati. It was described as "a colonial moment from Gujarat" depicting time of 1860s by Arshia Sattar of Open magazine. Radhika Herzberger of The Caravan magazine had praised the English translation.

== Adaptations and translations ==
The lyrics written in Lalit metre from the novel, Karan Raj! Tu, Kyah Re Gayo; Nagar Chhodine Shidne Rahyo; Karam Futiyu, Pran Jay Re; Sukh Sada Gayu, Hay Hay Re (Gujarati: "કરણ રાજ ! તું, ક્યાંહ રે ગયો; નગર છોડીને શીદને રહ્યો; કરમ ફૂટિયું, પ્રાણ જાય રે; સુખ સદા ગયું, હાય હાયરે") (English: "Karan Raja, O husband mine, why have you left me, where do you hide?") was composed with music and was immensely popular. Two years after the publication, in 1868, the novel was adapted into the play Gujarat No Chhello Raja Karan Ghelo (English: "Karan Ghelo, the Last King of Gujarat") by Parsi theatre of Bombay. The novel was translated into Marathi and serialised in a magazine Vividh Jananan Vistara. Mulshankar Mulani adapted the novel into the play Karanghelo in 1896 for Mumbai Gujarati Natak Mandali.

The story was also the subject of the silent film, Karan Ghelo (1924) by S. N. Patankar.

It was translated in English by Tulsi Vatsal and Aban Mukherji; and was published in Viking by Penguin Books India in 2015.

== Legacy ==
The story of Karan Vaghela has endured in the public memory of Gujarat. It is considered as the foundation of the historical fiction in Gujarati language. It was taught in Gujarati medium schools as textbook. Chandravadan Mehta also wrote a play, Sandhyakal on the same subject. The story also inspired two novels during the period of Mahagujarat Movement, the movement for the separate linguistic state of Gujarat; Bhagnapaduka (1955) by K. M. Munshi and Rai, Karan Ghelo (1960) by Dhumketu. The novel is also studied in academics to trace the roots of Gujarati regional identity.
