= Nandshankar Mehta =

Indian Gujarati novelist

Rao Bahadur Nandshankar Mehta
- Born: Mehta Nandshankar Tuljashankar; 21 April 1835; Surat, British India
- Died: 17 July 1905 (aged 70); Surat, British India
- Occupations: Novelist, social reformer
- Spouse: Nandagauri
- Children: Manubhai Mehta; Vinayak Mehta
- Relatives: Hansa Jivraj Mehta (granddaughter); Sumant Mehta (grandson)
- Writing career
- Language: Gujarati
- Notable work: Karan Ghelo (1866)

Nandshankar Tuljashankar Mehta (21 April 1835 – 17 July 1905) was an Indian Gujarati language author and social reformer. He is known for Karan Ghelo, the first original novel in Gujarati.

== Life ==
Nandshankar Mehta was born on 21 April 1835 at Surat to Nagar Brahmin family of Gangalaxmi and Tuljashankar Mehta. He started his studies in English medium school at the age of ten. After marriage to Nandagauri in 1855, he joined the same school as an assistant master.

In 1858, he became the first Indian headmaster of the school. Later he was appointed the principal of the Teachers’ Training College in Surat where he served till 1867. Sir Theodore Hope, a member of Government Textbooks’ Committee who had joined the Surat Municipality convinced Mehta to join Indian Civil Service. He joined the Revenue Department as a Mamlatdar of Ankleshwar. He also served as the Dewan of Cutch State in 1880 and the Assistant Political Agent at Godhra in 1883. He was awarded Rao Bahadur in 1877.

He was a social and religious reformer who was educated in western academics. He was closely associated with several social organisations which were involved in education of women; widow remarriage; abolishing caste ban on foreign travel; opposition of untouchability, superstitions and supernatural. He, along with other reformers like Durgaram Mehta, Dalpatram and two other colleagues; established the Manav Dharma Sabha dedicated to social and religious reforms. He was also a member of the Buddhivardhak Sabha which was established in Bombay in 1851.

After retirement in 1890, he worked with several organisations. He died on 17 July 1905 in Surat. He was the father of Manubhai Mehta and the grandfather of Hansa Mehta. He was also maternal grandfather of Sumant Mehta.

== Works ==
He wrote his only novel Karan Ghelo which he started in 1863 and completed in 1866. The novel depicts Karan Vaghela, the last Rajput ruler of Gujarat (c.1296 - 1304) who was defeated by the Turkish forces of Alauddin Khilji in 1298.

He translated R. G. Bhandarkar’s Sanskrit Margopadeshika and an English textbook on trigonometry into Gujarati. He had written several articles in newspapers. His son, Vinayak Mehta, had written his biography.

== See also ==
- List of Gujarati-language writers
