= Karna (Vaghela dynasty) =

King of Gujarat from 1296 to 1304

- Maharajadhiraja

King of Gujarat
- Reign: c. 1296 – c. 1304
- Predecessor: Sarangadeva
- Successor: Position abolished (Alauddin Khalji as the Sultan of the Delhi Sultanate)
- Spouse: Kamala Devi
- Issue: Devala Devi
- Dynasty: Vaghela
- Father: Rama

Karna (IAST: Karṇa, r. c. 1296 – c. 1304) was the last Vaghela king of Gujarat region in India. Little is known about his life except his defeat against Alauddin Khalji of the Delhi Sultanate. Alauddin's forces ransacked his kingdom in 1299, forcing him to flee Gujarat. Karna seems to have gained control of at least some part of his territory in the subsequent years. However, a second invasion in 1304 resulted in the end of the Vaghela dynasty.

== Names ==
Variations of his name include Karnadeva (in Vaghela inscriptions), Rai Karan, and Karan Dev (in vernacular literature). He is also known as Karna II to distinguish him from the Chaulukya king Karna. The 15th century epic poem Kanhadade Prabandha calls him "Rao Karnade". The 16th century Portuguese historian João de Barros calls him "Galacarna".

== Early life ==
Karna was a son of the Vaghela king Rama. Karna succeeded his uncle Saragadeva (the brother of Rama) on the throne. Sarangadeva's kingdom included the present-day Gujarat, and also extended up to Abu in present-day Rajasthan. Karna appears to have inherited this entire territory. Aside from his defeat against Alauddin Khalji, very little is known about his reign.

== Defeat against Alauddin Khalji ==
=== First Khalji invasion ===
According to medieval chronicles (such as Merutunga's Vichara-shreni and Padmanābha's Kanhadade Prabandha), Karna had abducted the wife of his minister Madhava and killed Madhava's brother. In revenge, Madhava instigated the Delhi Sultanate ruler Alauddin Khalji to invade his kingdom. In 1299, Alauddin invaded Gujarat, which was one of the wealthiest regions of India.

The invasion appears to have been a surprise for Karna, as Alauddin's army captured Gujarat easily in a very short time. This suggests that either Karna was unpopular among his subjects, or he had an ineffective military and administrative setup. The Jain chronicler Jinaprabha Suri states that Ulugh Khan's forces defeated Karna's army at Ashapalli (present-day Ahmedabad). According to the 14th century writer Isami, Karna weighed his options: putting up a fight against the invaders or retiring into a fortress. His ministers advised him to leave the country and return after the departure of the invaders, given his lack of war preparation. Historian A. K. Majumdar interprets Isami's writings to mean that Karna took shelter in a fort, but epigraphist Z. A. Desai notes that no such conclusion can be drawn from Isami's writings.

Ultimately, Karna fled to Devagiri, the capital of the neighbouring Yadava kingdom. A section of the Delhi army pursued him. The 14th century chronicler Isami states that he was refused asylum by the Yadavas, and had to seek shelter from the Kakatiya ruler Rudradeva. Meanwhile, the Delhi army plundered the wealthy cities of Gujarat, including the capital Anahilavada (modern Patan), Khambhat, Surat and Somnath.

=== Return to the throne ===
Subsequently, Karna seems to have recaptured at least some part of Gujarat, although is not known when exactly he returned to the throne. An Arabic epitaph from Khambat, dated 8 April 1299, names the deceased Shihab-ud-Din as the former governor (hakim) of Kambaya, that is, Khambhat. It is not clear whose subordinate Shihab-ud-Din was, but if he was a Muslim governor appointed by the invaders, it is possible that Khambhat was under Khalji control at this time.

An inscription found at the Sampla village in Gujarat attests that Karna was ruling at Patan on 4 August 1304. The Jain author Merutunga also states that he ruled up to 1304 CE. The 14th century Muslim chronicler Isami also suggests that Karna managed to regain his power. According to Isami, Alauddin had handed over the administration of the newly-captured Chittor Fort to Malik Shahin in 1303. But sometime later, Malik Shahin fled the fort because he was afraid of Karna, who ruled the neighbouring territory.

During the invading army's return journey to Delhi, its Mongol soldiers had rebelled against their commanders over their share of the loot from Gujarat. Some of these rebel Mongols appear to have sought asylum from Karna: his 1304 inscription indicates that the Mongol officers Balchaq and Shadi held high positions under in his administration.

=== Second Khalji invasion ===
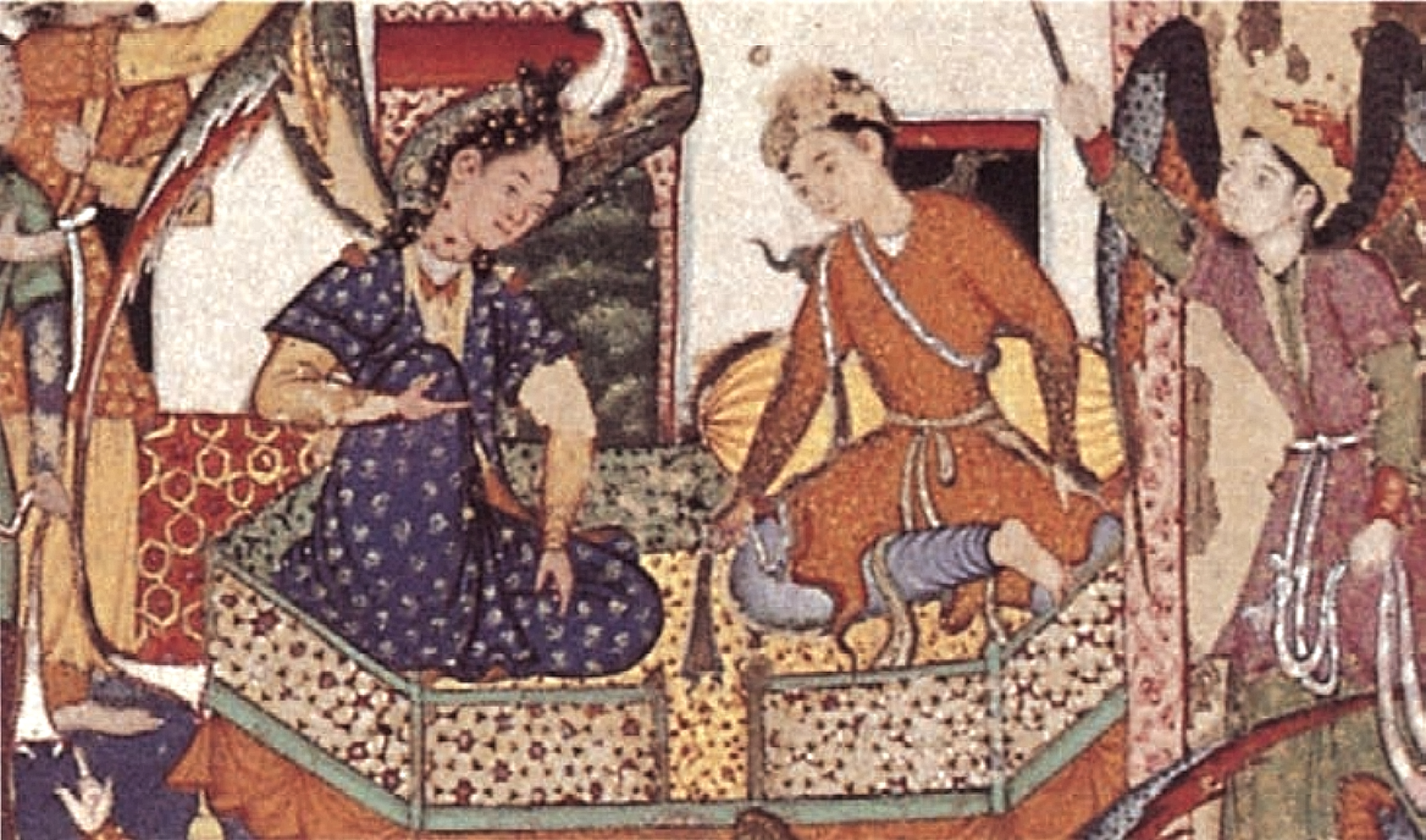
Devala Devi, daughter of Karna (Karan Deva II) with Khizr Khan, son of Alauddin Khalji, enthroned (detail). Duval Rani Khizr Khan of Amir Khusrau Dihvali. Scribe: Sultan Bayazid ibn Nizam. Mughal, dated A.H. 976 (1568) National Museum, New Delhi (L53.217).

Karna lost his throne permanently after a second invasion from Delhi in 1304. According to Amir Khusrau's poem Ashiqa, the invasion resulted from a request by Karna's former wife Kamala Devi, who had been captured by Alauddin's forces during the first invasion. Eight years after being inducted into Alauddin's harem, Kamala Devi requested Alauddin to get her daughter Devala Devi from Gujarat. Although Karna agreed to the demand, Alauddin ordered his army to invade Gujarat for a second time. Ashiqa is not historically reliable, but some of the later medieval writers present its narrative as history. Other medieval chroniclers give different accounts of this incident, some of them omitting the bit about Kamala Devi's request. According to the 16th century chronicler Firishta, Karna escaped to the Yadava kingdom, where Ramachandra of Devagiri gave him the principality of Baglana. Karna was defeated during Alauddin Khalji's conquest of Devagiri, and his daughter Devala was captured and taken to Delhi. According to one account, he fled towards Devagiri, but was denied asylum there, and ultimately sought shelter from the Kakatiyas in Warangal.

The Jain writer Kakka Suri, in his Nabhi-nandana-jinoddhara-prabandha (1336), describes the end of Karna as follows: "On account of his [Alauddin's] prowess, Karṇa, the ruler of Gurjaratrā, fled away in all haste and having wandered about in many kingdoms died the death of a pauper." No concrete information is available about Karna's death or his descendants. A 1498 CE inscription shows that a family of the Vaghela clan was ruling at a place called Dandahi, as subordinates of the Muslim ruler Mahmud Begada. The rulers of the Rewa State also claimed descent from the Vaghelas through one Bhimadeva.

== Inscriptions ==
Find spots of the inscriptions issued during Karna's reign.

Karna's inscriptions have been found at Mangrol, Desan near Bhiloda, and Sampla near Jambusar.

=== 1297 Desan inscription ===
A 1297 CE inscription, which records the construction of a Surya (the Sun God) temple during Karna's reign, was found on the wall of a temple in the Bhavnath or Desan village near Bhiloda. In 1910, it was published in Buddhiprakash under the name "Muralidhar Temple Inscription". The inscription is dated 27 October 1297 CE (Vikrama Samvat 1354 expired).

The inscription features a 33-stanza prashasti (eulogy) composed by the poet Sangrama: from a literary perspective, it is composed rather poorly, and suffers from grammatical mistakes, out-of-place expressions, and repetition. The inscription was engraved by Nayaka, a son of Sutra-Petha.

The poet pays obeisance to Ganesha and the Sun God at the beginning of the prashasti, and then introduces the Vaghela family. The family is mentioned by the name Dhavalauka (literally, "of Dhavala", that is, of the original Vaghela capital Dholka). It is said to have been devoted to the gods Vishnu and Shankara (Shiva).

First, the poet mentions Karna's ancestor Anaka (Arnoraja), who is described as a scion of the Chaulukya family and the ruler of Saurashtra. Next, the poet mentions Anaka's son Lavanaprasada, his son Viradhavala, and his son Pratapamalla. No royal titles are assigned to Karna's great-grandfather Pratapamalla, who did not ascend the throne. The inscription credits Pratapamalla's younger brother, king Vishvala (Visaladeva), with destroying the Paramara king and destroying his capital Dhara. It states that Vishvala appointed Pratapamalla's son Arjuna on the throne before he died. Arjuna's son and Karna's father Rama is described as the next imperial ruler (nripa-chakravartin), and Rama's brother Saranga-deva is credited with defeating Goga, presumably the Paramara minister Goga, who had become the de facto ruler of the Paramara kingdom. Finally, the inscription describes the reigning king Karna.

The actual hero of the eulogy, however, is Vaijalla-deva, the maternal uncle of the poet Sangrama. The eulogy traces his paternal ancestry to Mahadeva, a Shaivite who belonged to the Shandilya gotra. Mahadeva's grandson and Vaijalla's father Munjala-deva is said to have died in a fight with cattle-thieves, while protecting men and cows. The poet traces Vaijalla's maternal ancestry to Rajiga of the Kashyapa gotra. Rajiga's grand-daughter Nala-devi (also called Anala-devi) was the mother of Vaijalla. According to the eulogy, Vaijalla-deva was a devotee of Shiva and his consort Shakti, as well as of Vairochana (that is, son of Virochana or the Sun God; the poet probably intended to mention the Sun God himself). Vaijalla is said to have man donations of cows, land, gold, and other objects. Further, he is credited with constructing the temple of Munjala-svami-deva (literally, "lord of Munjala", a name for the Sun God) in the memory of his parents Munjala and Nala. The temple is said to have been situated beside the Bhrigu-kunda tank: it is not clear if it is same as the temple on whose wall the inscription was found.

The inscription describes Sangrama as a poet-warrior, and states that he was the son of Vaijalla's sister Hridevi.

=== 1304 Sampla inscription ===
A bilingual Persian-Sanskrit inscription from Karna's reign was found on a marble slab in 1981, during digging operations at the Sampla village in Gujarat. Such slabs are usually part of a headstone, but no other fragments or monuments were discovered in its vicinity. The inscription, issued on 4 August 1304, records the donation of a village to the Jami mosque of Khambhat (not to be confused with the present-day structure) by Karna's Muslim officers, with the king's permission.

1304 Sampla inscription of Karna reconstructed portions in square brackets
	Persian portion	Sanskrit portion
Script	Naskh	Nagari
Date	1 Muharram 704 AH	[2] Bhadrapada 1360 Samvat
King	Rai Karn Dev	Maharajadhiraja Ka[rna-deva]
Donors	Maliku'l-Akabir ("Prince among the Great") Balchaq, Maliku'l-Umara ("Prince of the nobles") Shadi, Taju'd-Din ("Crown of the Religion") Hasan	[Ma]lik Shri Baḍchak, Malik Shri [Shadi], Shri Hasaṇa
Donee	Jami mosque of Kambaya	[Ja]mi mosque of Stam[bhatirtha]
Donation	Samba village in the Kanam region (present-day Bharuch-Vadodara area)	Sampa village in Kanam

Shadi and Balchaq appear to have been Mongol officers who rebelled against the Khalji commander, and sought service under Karna. Balchaq is apparently same as the officer who is called "Baljaq", "Yalchaq", and "Yalhaq" in various manuscripts of Isami's Futuh-us-Salatin: Isami names him among the Mongol rebels who joined Karna. Yahya bin Ahmad Sirhindi, a 15th century chronicler, mentions Shadi Bugha among the Mongol chiefs of the Khalji army: the Shadi mentioned in Karna's inscription is probably same as this chief. The inscription describes Hasan as a son of Vaziru'l-Vuzara ("Minister of Ministers", that is, Chief Minister) Najmu'd-Dunya wa'd-Din; it is possible that was a rich merchant-plutocrat of Khambhat.

== In popular culture ==
Karna is mentioned in several medieval Muslim chronicles that describe Alauddin's conquest of Gujarat. The event is also described in several Hindu and Jain chronicles, including Merutunga's Prabandha-Chintamani (1305), Dharmaranya (c. 1300-1450), Jinaprabha Suri's Tirthakalpataru (14th century), and Padmanābha's Kanhadade Prabandha (1455).

Karna (as "Karan") is the central character in the 1866 novel Karan Ghelo. Written by Nandshankar Mehta, the book was the first original modern Gujarati novel. In Karan Ghelo, Karan abducts Roopsundari, the wife of his prime minister Madhav, a Nagar Brahmin. Madhav's brother dies trying to protect Roopsundari. Madhav then decides to take revenge, and persuades Alauddin Khalji to invade Gujarat. In the following war, Karan loses his kingdom and his wife Kaularani to Alauddin. Some years later, he also loses his daughter Devaldevi, thus gaining the epithet ghelo ("foolish"). The story was also adapted as the silent film, Karan Ghelo (1924) by S. N. Patankar.
