= Manubhai Mehta =

Indian politician (1868–1946)

Sir Manubhai Mehta
- Born: Manubhai Nandshankar Mehta; 22 July 1868
- Died: 14 October 1946 (aged 78)
- Education: Elphinstone College
- Children: 4 children from 2 marriages: Hansa Mehta, Jayashri Raiji, Kantichandra Mehta, Minal Saran
- Father: Nandshankar Mehta

Sir Manubhai Nandshankar Mehta CSI (22 July 1868 – 14 October 1946) was an Indian politician. He was the dewan of Baroda state from 9 May 1916 to 1927. From 1927 to 1934, he was the prime minister of Bikaner state.

== Life ==
He was born on 22 July 1868 to Nandshankar Mehta. He was educated at Elphinstone College in Bombay. He was Professor of Logic and Philosophy and a lecturer in law at Baroda College in 1891-1899. He was the private secretary to HH Maharaja Gaekwad of Baroda state from 1899 to 1906 and revenue minister and first councillor from 1914 to 1916. He was also dewan of Baroda state from 9 May 1916 to 1927. Then Maharaja Ganga Singh of Bikaner state brought Manu Bhai Mehta from the Baroda state and made him the first prime minister and chief councillor of the Bikaner state in 1927. He worked there until 1934 and, until 1940, continued as councillor of Bikaner. He fixed the retirement age at 58 years for the employees of the Bikaner state from 55 years. He was a delegate on behalf of the Indian States to the three Round Table Conferences in London. Mehta acted as a substitute in the absence of the Maharaja Ganga Singh of Bikaner. Similarly, he attended the World Hygiene Conference in 1933 and was in the Indian States' delegation to the Joint Parliamentary Committee in 1933. He was appointed home minister of Gwalior state in 1937.

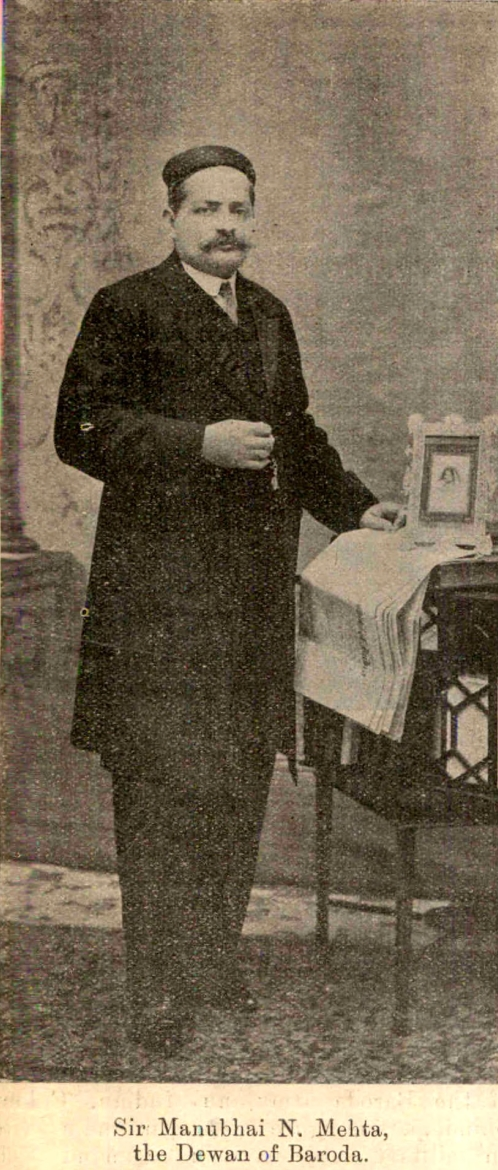
Mehta in 1924

He was considered one of the major architects of Baroda's reforms. He led an effort to proselytize constitutional, democratic reforms throughout princely India through the organ of the Chamber of Princes beginning in the 1920s. This was called as "Mehta strategy" by Copland. By the late 1940s, virtually all major states had adopted some measure of reform including Bikaner, Kotah, Jaipur, Alwar, Dholpur and Gwalior.

Mehta died on 14 October 1946. He was the father of Hansa Mehta, Jayshree Raiji and Kantichandra Mehta
