= Jayaben Shah =

Indian politician

Member of the Indian Parliament for Lok Sabha
- In office 1957–1971
- Succeeded by: Jivraj Mehta
- Constituency: Amreli

Personal details
- Born: 1 October 1922 Bhavnagar, Bhavnagar State, British India
- Died: 14 April 2014 Ahmedabad
- Party: Indian National Congress
- Spouse: Vajubhai Shah
- Children: 1 son (Akshay) and 1 daughter (Amita)

Jayaben Vajubhai Shah (1 October 1922 — 14 April 2014) was an Indian politician and a member of the Indian National Congress political party. She was elected to the Lok Sabha, the lower house of the Parliament of India, in 1957 from Girnar in Bombay State. From 1962 to 1967, she represented the constituency of Amreli in Gujarat.
