= Virjibhai Thummar =

Indian politician (1959–2026)

MP
- In office 2004–2009
- Constituency: Amreli

Member of legislative assembly
- In office 2017-2022
- Constituency: Lathi

Personal details
- Born: 31 May 1959 Amreli, Gujarat, India
- Died: 7 October 2026 (aged 67) Amreli, Gujarat, India
- Party: Indian National Congress
- Spouse: Smt. Nilaben
- Children: 1 daughter
- As of 25 February, 2006

Virjibhai Thummar (31 May 1959 – 7 October 2026) was an Indian politician who was a member of the Indian National Congress. He was a Member of Parliament and a member of Legislative Assembly.

Thummar died on 7 October 2026, at the age of 67, after a brief illness.
