= Khambha =

Town in India

- Town
- Location in Gujarat, India Khambha (India)
- Coordinates: 21.1295327°N 71.2160756°E
- Country: India
- State: Gujarat
- District: Amreli

Population (2011)
  - Total: 10,709

Languages
  - Official: Gujarati, Hindi
- Time zone: UTC+5:30 (IST)
- Postal code: 365650
- Vehicle registration: GJ-14
- Website: gujaratindia.com

Khambha is a town in Amreli district of Saurashtra region of Gujarat state in India which is also the administrative headquarters of Khambha taluka. The main occupation of the people of Khambha village is agriculture, farm labor, animal husbandry and the main crops are wheat, cumin, groundnut, sesame, millet, chickpea, cotton, diwela, alfalfa and vegetables.
