= Khambha taluka =

Taluka in Gujarat, India

Khambha Taluka
- Taluka of Gujarat
- Interactive map of Khambha Taluka
- Coordinates: 21.1293°N 71.2051°E
- Country: India
- State: Gujarat
- District: Amreli
- Headquarters: Khambha

Population (2011)
  - Total: 93,431
  - Sex ratio: 979 ♂/♀
  - Literacy: 69.23%

Languages
  - Official: Gujarati, Hindi
- Time zone: UTC+5:30 (IST)
- Telephone code: +91-079
- Vehicle registration: GJ

Khambha Taluka is a geographical subdivision located in the Amreli district of the state of Gujarat, India. It is situated in the western part of the country and falls within the Saurashtra region. Khambha is the headquarters of the taluka.

== Demographics ==
According to 2011 Census, Khambha Sub-District, has a population of 93,431 individuals distributed across 17,476 households, 47,214 males and 46,217 females, with a child population of 12,076 (6,196 males and 5,880 females). The social composition includes 7,666 individuals from Scheduled Castes (3,917 males and 3,749 females) and 87 individuals from Scheduled Tribes (43 males and 44 females). In terms of education, 56,321 individuals are literate, comprising 32,520 males and 23,801 females, while 37,110 individuals are reported as illiterate, with 14,694 males and 22,416 females. The economic landscape indicates 41,091 individuals engaged in various forms of work (27,861 males and 13,230 females), while 52,340 individuals are categorized as non-workers, consisting of 19,353 males and 32,987 females.
